= Budapest Convention of 1877 =

The Budapest Convention (Budapester Vertrag) was a secret agreement between Austria-Hungary and Russia in 1877 to agree on policies and the division of powers in Southeast Europe in the eventuality of war between Russia and the Ottoman Empire. The so-called Eastern Question (Orientalische Frage), the division of the declining Ottoman Empire in the Balkans, was a priority of the European great powers in the nineteenth century. For Russia, obtaining assurances of Austro-Hungarian neutrality was also a priority.

The agreement confirmed the results of the earlier Reichstadt Agreement and was made between the Emperor Franz Joseph and Tsar Alexander II of Russia initially during the Constantinople Conference (1876–1877) and was subsequently finalised in Budapest on January 15, 1877.

== Secret agreements ==
The main points of the Convention of Budapest were:

- In the event of a Russian attack on the Ottoman Empire, Austria would remain benevolently neutral
- Austria-Hungary might, at a time of its choice, occupy Bosnia and Herzegovina (but not the Sanjak of Novi Pazar)
- Serbia, Montenegro and Novi Pazar would be treated by the two powers as a "neutral zone"

In the case of a complete disintegration of the Ottoman Empire:

- Austria-Hungary and Russia would work to ensure that a number of small, sovereign states were created in the Balkan peninsula but not a closed Slavic power bloc that could jeopardize the "European balance" (Europäische Gleichgewicht)
- Constantinople and the surrounding area would be a "free city" (Freie Stadt)
- Russia would receive southern Bessarabia
- Independence would be granted to Bulgaria, Albania and Rumelia
- Greece would gain Crete, Thessaly and parts of Epirus

== Purpose ==
The agreement to make Constantinople a Free City was not in the convention proper, but in an even more secret supplementary agreement. These documents shed some light on the aims of the Russian Tsar. Like his predecessor Nicholas I, Alexander II saw an opportunity of finally realising the Greek Project. This was a plan originally proposed between Catherine the Great and Joseph II to partition the Ottoman Empire and restore the Greek Byzantine Empire. Turkey's power would be finally broken, and the Balkans would become the sphere of influence of the double headed eagle empires of Austria-Hungary and Russia (both states had adopted the double headed emblem of the Byzantine Empire the symbol of the last Byzantine dynasty, the Palaiologos).

For Austria-Hungary, it was important that Russia did not attempt to create a large Slavic state (großen, kompakten, slawischen Staat) in the Balkans that would create problems with the Slavic nations within the monarchy. Even in a convention signed with Great Britain on 18 March 1877, there was an emphasis on Russia not creating a large state in the Balkans.

The Budapest Convention was one of several secret agreements with which Russia sought to secure the support or at least the neutrality of Austria-Hungary. In addition to the Reichstadt Agreement a year earlier there was a supplementary convention to this treaty in March 1877.

== Aftermath ==
After the atrocities committed by the Turks in the Bulgarian April Uprising, Russia declared war on the Ottoman Empire in April 1877. Russia achieved significant success in a fairly short time, culminating in the Treaty of San Stefano, which gave full independence to Romania, Serbia and Montenegro.

However, the main provision was the creation of a large Bulgarian state reaching from the Aegean Sea in the south to Lake Ohrid in the west. This development was met with dismay in Austria-Hungary and Britain. The size of the new principality was interpreted as being in violation of the Budapest convention.

Russia's actions sparked a serious diplomatic crisis between the major European powers. Riots broke out in the Balkans, the Muslim population protesting against the annexations. To avert another war, the Congress of Berlin was convened. Neither party held to the agreements they had undertaken in the convention. This was facilitated at the very least because the agreement was known only to Russia and Austria-Hungary.

== See also ==
- Andrássy Note
- Austria–Russia relations
- Balkanization
- Berlin Memorandum
- Bulgarian Crisis (1885–1888)
- Great Eastern Crisis
- International relations (1814–1919)

== Bibliography ==
- Gerhard Herm: Der Balkan. Das Pulverfaß Europas. Econ Verlag, Düsseldorf 1993, ISBN 3-430-14445-0, p. 295.
- Stanford Shaw, Ezel Kural Shaw: History of the Ottoman Empire and Modern Turkey. 2 vols. Cambridge University Press, Cambridge 1976/77.
