= Bulgarian Crisis (1885–1888) =

Historical political situation in Europe

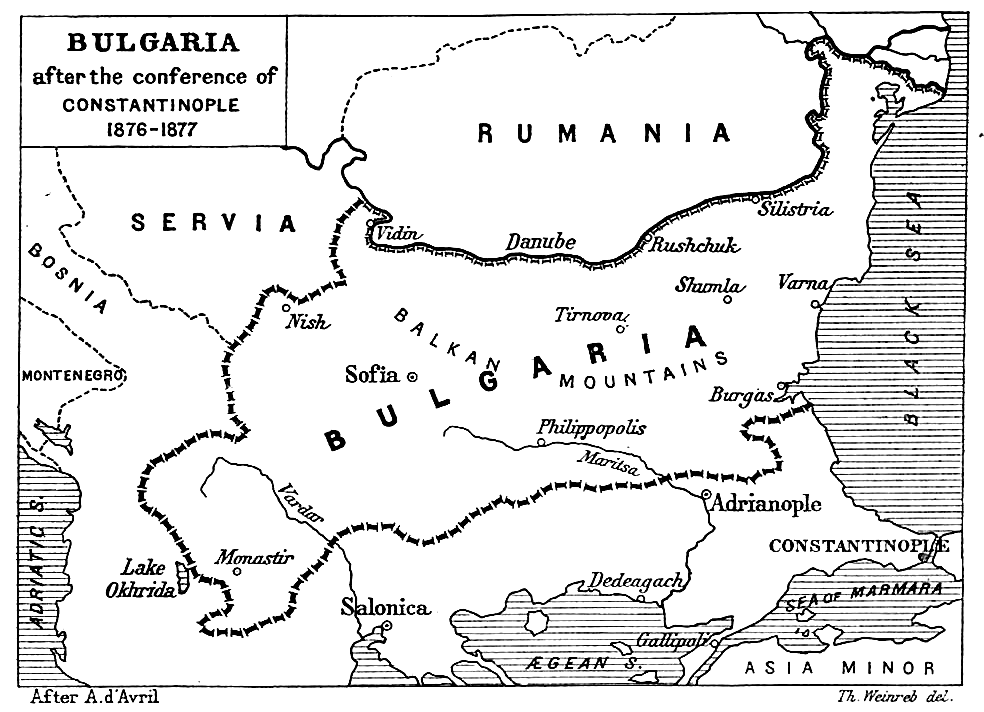
- Bulgaria following Constantinople Conference 1877
- Native name: Българска криза
- Date: September 18, 1885
- Location: Eastern Rumelia
- Cause: Bulgarian victory: Union between Eastern Rumelia and Bulgaria

The Bulgarian Crisis (Българска криза, Balgarska kriza) refers to a series of events in the Balkans between 1885 and 1888 that affected the balance of power between the Great Powers and the conflict between Austria-Hungary and the Russian Empire. It was one of several episodes in the continuing Balkan Crisis as vassal states struggled for independence from the Ottoman Empire but achieved a mosaic of nascent nation-states (Balkanisation). They featured unstable alliances that frequently led to war and eventually to the First World War.

== Background ==
The Ottoman rejection of the terms of the Constantinople Conference (1876-1877) led to the Russo-Turkish War (1877–1878), which concluded with the Treaty of San Stefano and the Treaty of Berlin (1878), which established the independent Principality of Bulgaria. The original treaty signed by Russia and Turkey at San Stefano created a greater pro-Russian Bulgaria out of the defeated Ottoman lands. That appeared to contravene earlier secret Russian undertakings in Reichstadt on July 8, 1876 and also later in Budapest between Count Andrassy and the Russian envoy, Eugene Novikov, (Budapest Convention, 15 January, 18 March 1877). The treaties agreed that a Russian victory in war would not create any large Slavic states. Russia had also traded Austrian neutrality for Bosnia-Herzegovina.

The enlargement of the Russian sphere of influence angered the other Balkan states and alarmed the other Great Powers. They initially threatened war against Russia and then convened the Berlin Conference at the behest of Austro-Hungarian Foreign Minister Gyula Andrássy to dismantle and to rework the provisions of San Stefano. The treaty also established international recognition of the neighbouring former Ottoman vassal states of Romania, Serbia and Montenegro. It broke up "Greater Bulgaria" into a northern Principality of Bulgaria and two southern territories under Ottoman control, Macedonia and the autonomous Eastern Rumelia. Also, Bosnia and Herzegovina were transferred to Austria-Hungary.

Unfortunately, the treaty solved little. It satisfied Britain and Austria-Hungary but only at the expense of Russia and the peoples of the Balkan states, which made further crises inevitable.

The future of the Balkan lands was thus now perceived in Europe as a matter for the disposal of the Great Powers. Those events significantly impacted the dynastic relations between Germany and Russia. To counterbalance Russian influence and perceived Pan-Slavic expansion in the Balkans, Germany and Austria-Hungary thus concluded the Dual Alliance (Zweibund) in 1879.

== Bulgarian unification and Serbo-Bulgarian War ==
Bulgaria after Treaties of San Stefano and Berlin, 1878

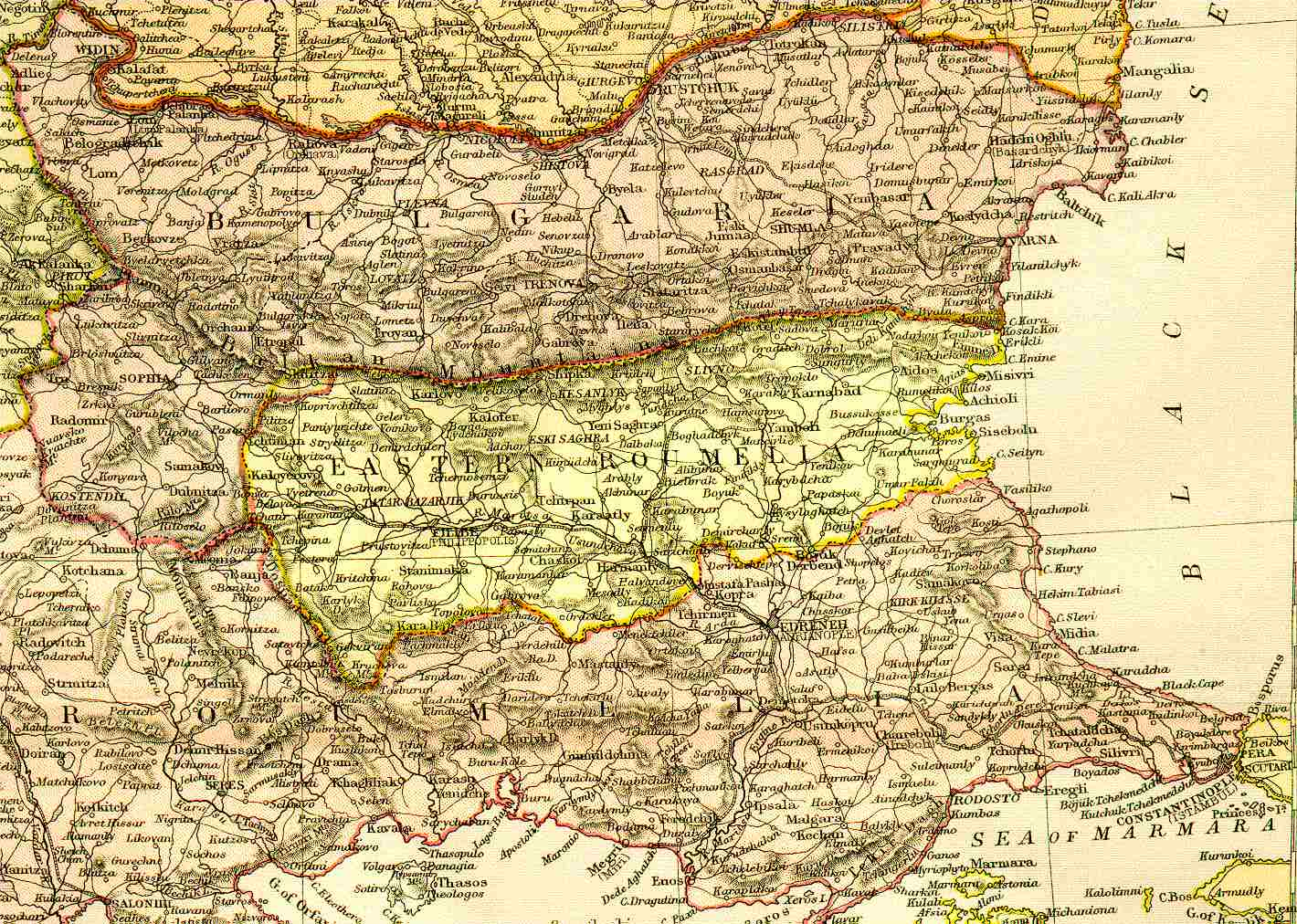
Bulgaria and Rumelia 1882

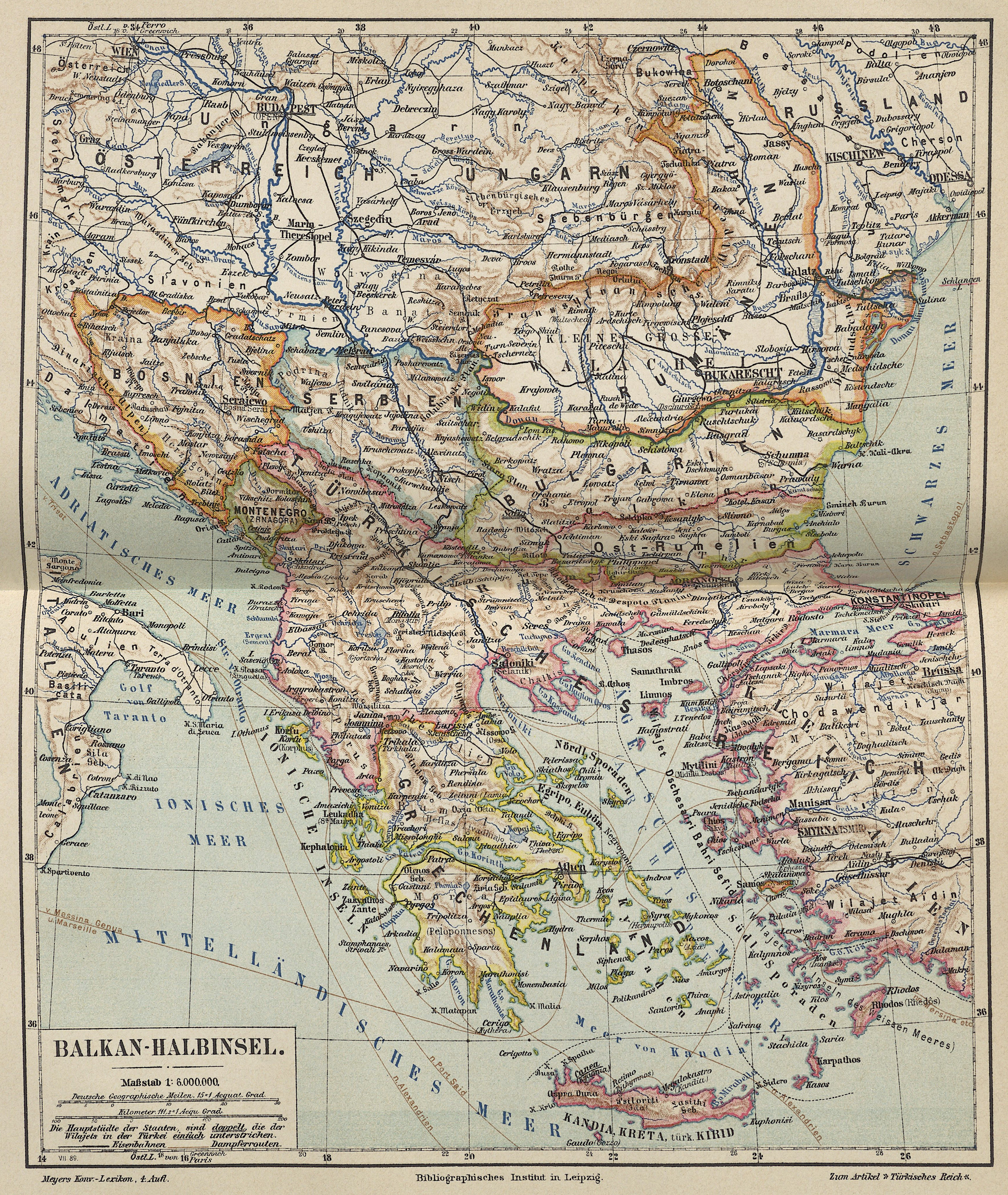
Bulgaria 1890, post unification

On September 18, 1885, a rebellion and a coup in the Ottoman province of Eastern Rumelia, aided by the Bulgarians, saw the people proclaim a union with the Principality of Bulgaria, in violation of the Treaty of Berlin (1878). In Europe, the union caused consternation in the Great Powers by altering the power balance in the repeatedly-unstable Balkans and risking Ottoman retaliation and Russian intervention on behalf of Bulgaria. However, tension between Russian Tsar Alexander III and the German-born Knyaz (Prince) Alexander I of Bulgaria led to the Russians standing aside, withdrawing their troops from Bulgaria and advocating a conference in Constantinople. The other Great Powers in general supported Russia's unexpected position but not Greece and Serbia.

Serbia had signed a secret treaty with Austria-Hungary in 1881 and was so sure in Austria's support that it made territorial demands on its western border with Bulgaria. On being rebuffed, Serbia declared war on November 14. However, by November 28, Serbia had been defeated by Bulgaria. Further humiliation of Serbia was prevented only by Austrian intervention.

A Russophile coup against Alexander I in 1886 replaced him by an Austrophile, who was the Austrian Emperor's nephew and an officer in the Austrian army, Prince Ferdinand of Saxe-Coburg and Gotha (1887–1918). Relations of the young Bulgarian state with Russia deteriorated.

== Effects on Great Powers ==
The events in the Balkans were in a way proxy events for their supporters, Russia and Austria-Hungary, and effectively dissolved (1887) the fragile alliance between Germany, Austria and Russia known as the League of Three Emperors (Dreikaiserabkommen) 1873–1878, which had been revived on June 18, 1881. The League provided for mutual aid in the event of an attack on a member and benign neutrality in the event of one of them being involved in a conflict outside the League. Its terms also provided for consultation on any proposed Balkan operations, which offered Germany the neutrality of Russia, in the event of a further war against France, and Russia the neutrality of Germany and Austria-Hungary, in the event of war against Britain or the Ottomans. The protocol was secret and was renewed in 1884. It stated in part:

„4. Die drei Mächte werden sich der etwaigen Vereinigung Bulgariens und Ostrumeliens in den Gebietsgrenzen, die durch den Berliner Vertrag angewiesen sind, nicht widersetzen, wenn diese Frage sich durch die Macht der Dinge erheben sollte.“
(4. The three powers will not oppose the eventual unification of Bulgaria and Eastern Rumelia within the limits set by the Treaty of Berlin, should this eventuality occur by force of circumstances.)

When that eventually occurred, the situation was more complicated. Prince Alexander of Battenberg had been elected in 1879 as Prince of Bulgaria at the request of his uncle, Russian Tsar Alexander II. Prince Alexander found himself obliged to support the nationalist movement for re-unification despite the advice of the Russian ministers and advisers but with the apparent support of British Prime Minister Gladstone, who opposed Russia's position. Russia then withdrew its ministers and advisers from Bulgaria.

Another complication was the role of King Milan of Serbia, an ally of Austria, another opponent of Russia in the Balkans. Milan sought territorial compensation from Bulgaria. When he did not receive it, he declared war in 1885. Defeated, Serbia saw Bulgarian troops reach Belgrade before Austria intervened. The Treaty of Bucharest in March 1886 essentially restored the status quo.

The Great Powers and the Porte finally accepted the Unification of Bulgaria in the 1886 Tophane Agreement. Russia, however, was not satisfied and Russian Tsar Alexander III refused to recognise Prince Alexander as ruler of the newly-enlarged Bulgaria. Subsequently, a Russian-backed coup, involving a group pro-Russian officers, forced Prince Alexander to abdicate on 9 August 1886. He was then exiled to Russia. In a countercoup, Prince Alexander I returned to the Bulgarian throne, and Russia then broke off diplomatic relations with Bulgaria.

The Great Powers, which were in a constant fear of war between them, continued with a series of complicated agreements and alliances, many of which were secret, as deterrents to one another's actions, largely at the behest of Bismarck. These included the Triple Alliance, which replaced the Dual Alliance in 1882 by including Italy; two Mediterranean Agreements (Mittelmeerentente) in 1887 and the Reinsurance Treaty (1887). Finally, the publication of the terms of the 1879 treaty persuaded Russia that further action was not in its interests and so it withdrew from involvement in Bulgaria, and the fear of war dissipated. Bismarck's strategy was arcane but largely successful in averting war during his time in office (1871–1890). Unfortunately, his arrangements were heavily dependent on himself and so failed to provide long-term solutions.

== Chronology of the Bulgarian Crisis ==
=== Precursors ===
- League of Three Emperors 1873-1887
- Reichstadt Agreement 1876
- Constantinople Conference (1876-1877)
- Budapest Convention 1877
- Russo-Turkish War (1877–1878)
- Treaty of San Stefano 1878
- Congress of Berlin
- Treaty of Berlin (1878)
- Peace of Constantinople (1879)
- Dual Alliance, 1879
- Austro-Serbian Alliance of 1881
- Triple Alliance 1882

=== Crisis ===
- Bulgarian unification 1885
- Serbo-Bulgarian War 1885
- Treaty of Bucharest (1886)
- 1886 Bulgarian coup d'état
- Tophane Agreement 1886

=== Aftermath ===
- Mediterranean Agreements 1887
- Reinsurance Treaty 1887-1890

== See also ==
- Eastern Question
- History of the Balkans
- History of Bulgaria
- Bulgarian irredentism
- Decline of the Ottoman Empire
- Causes of World War I

== Sources ==
- Crampton, R. J. A Concise History of Bulgaria Cambridge UP 1997
- Präliminarfriede von San Stefano in: Konferenzen und Verträge. Vertrags-Ploetz. Handbuch der geschichtlich bedeutsamen Zusammenkünfte und Vereinbarungen. Teil II. 1493 - 1952. Helmuth Rönnefahrt (ed.). Bielefeld: A. G. Ploetz Verlag, 1953, pp. 351f
- István Diószegi: Kálnoky, Andrássy und die bulgarische Krise 1885–1887. In: Bulgarian Historical Review 3 (1985) pp. 54–59.
- Barbara Jelavich: Russia, Britain and the Bulgarian Question 1885–1888. In: Südostforschungen 32 (1973) pp. 168–191.
- M. Ju. Zolotucbin: Bolgarskij krizis 1885-1886 gg. i krach avstro-russko-germanskogo sojuza (The Bulgarian 1885-1886 crisis and the collapse of the Austro-Russian-German alliance) In: Voprosy istorii 4 (1984), pp. 43–56.
