= Berlin Memorandum =

1876 political document

The Berlin Memorandum was a document drawn up by the three imperial world powers in 1876 to address the Eastern Question during the Crisis of 1875-1878. The purpose of the Berlin Memorandum was for the three imperial powers of Russia, Austria-Hungary, and Germany to address the state of relations between the Islamic Ottoman Empire and with the Christian peoples of the Balkans, with whom these imperial powers had international relationships and interests, and to correct the "Andrássy Note", a document that preceded the Berlin Memorandum and had similar intentions in creating an armistice and plan of reforms for the Balkans and the Ottoman Empire.

== Background ==
As the Ottoman Empire began to decline in the late 19th century, there were many nationalistic Christian uprisings in the Balkan States, whose populations wished to be free from the Islamic rule of the Ottoman Empire. In 1875, there were a series of rebellions that broke out first in Bosnia and Herzegovina, and then in Bulgaria. One of the main points of contention between the Balkans and their Ottoman rulers was the religious difference, which led to a bolstering of religious and ethnic nationalism that contributed to the uprisings that took place during the period of the Balkan Crisis. The bloodiness and destruction of Christians led to an exodus of Christians into Serbia and Montenegro, and these countries had gained the diplomatic support of the Russian Empire.

== The "Andrássy Note" ==
Initially, the three great powers, Germany, Austria-Hungary, and Russia formed the League of the Three Emperors in 1872 and met to discuss the state of relations in the Near East. This meeting concluded with the policy of non-intervention in the East. However, as religious tensions between Christians and Muslims in Bosnia and Herzegovina began to come to a head, Count Gyula Andrássy of Austria-Hungary began to feel the need for religious reform in the Balkans, and so on December 30, 1875, Austria-Hungary, Russia, and Germany proposed the Andrássy Note. The note called for religious reforms that would allow the coexistence of Christians and Muslims in Bosnia and Herzegovina by incorporating Christian law into the Ottoman Empire's traditional Islamic law, reforms in the system of tax farming that would alleviate the tax burden on Bosnia and Herzegovina, and ensure that the Ottoman Empire make proper revenue in taxes, and laws that would address the agrarian conflict in Bosnia and Herzegovina.

However, by 1876, the note was considered a failure because the Ottomans, who had been pushed by Andrássy and never had intentions of reforming the Empire, had never acted to implement it.

== The Berlin Memorandum ==
After the outbreak of a Bulgarian Uprising in April and its brutal supression by May, the Andrássy Note was considered a failure. The Russian Foreign Minister Gorchakov invited his counterpart Andrássy to meet with German Chancellor Otto von Bismarck in Berlin in order to collaborate on a new armistice between the Balkans and the Ottoman Empire, as well as to renew the alliance with Austria and Germany. Andrássy complied, but only if he could arrive to Berlin early in order to have a preliminary meeting with Bismarck to discuss relations between Austria-Hungary and Germany.

In May 1876, Germany, Austria-Hungary, and Russia met in Berlin to discuss the response and plan of action to take in regards to the state of affairs in the Ottoman Empire and the Balkans. They drafted the Berlin Memorandum, which voiced the intent to protect the Christian populations of the Balkans. It demanded that the Ottoman Empire end military response to the Slavic rebels for two months in order to give enough time for reforms to be put in place in the Balkans. The memorandum also requested that an international committee be formed and instituted in the Balkans in order to protect the Christians, and see that the changes proposed in the Andrássy Note of 1875 could be administered in Bosnia and Herzegovina. The new armistice sought in the Berlin Memorandum was incorporated into the following five points, which originated in Andrássy's initial note:

1. Provision by the Turkish government of materials for rebuilding houses and churches and the furnishing of subsistence until the next harvest,
2. Distribution of this aid in collaboration with the mixed commission provided for in the Andrássy Note,
3. Temporary concentration of Turkish troops,
4. Right of the Christians to bear arms,
5. Surveillance by foreign consuls or delegates of the application of reforms in general and repatriation in particular.

The end of the note was written by Prince Gorkachov of Russia and states that if the Ottoman Empire did not meet the demands of the Berlin Memorandum and failed to comply with the requested two-month armistice, the three authoring imperial powers would take necessary international measures to provide for the safety of the people in the Balkans "in order to arrest the prevailing evil and prevent its development." The day following the agreement of the three imperial powers, French, Italian, and British representatives were summoned to Berlin in order to discuss the new armistice agreement.

== Western response to the Eastern question ==
The response of the three major western powers of Great Britain, Italy, and France varied, though France and Italy's position was generally the same while Britain had rejected the Berlin Memorandum completely.

While Italy did have a position on any decisions made by the central powers, it initially deferred the controversy surrounding the Eastern Question because Italy had a power struggle of its own within the Italian government at the time of both the Andrássy Note and the Berlin Memorandum. In April 1876, Italian Prime Minister Melegari promised the German minister the service of his army in Bosnia if necessary. On May 14, the day after the Berlin Memorandum was circulated in the city of Berlin, Italy gave its full and abiding support to the provisions made by the Berlin Memorandum through telegraph.

France's response to the memorandum followed that of the Italians. While France's role in the outcome of the Eastern Question seemed inconsequential, the tragic murder of a French consul in Salonika shocked and appalled French officials, and thus the memorandum earned support from France on the grounds that peace would be achieved in the Balkans and that the demands of the Berlin Memorandum would include the input of the three outside western powers in order to bring about the desired change.

While France and Italy quickly gave their support to the Berlin Memorandum, British Prime Minister Benjamin Disraeli rejected the document altogether on May 16, 1876. His reasons for rejecting the memorandum were cited by his idea that the three imperial powers were using the initiatives of the Berlin Memorandum to put an end to the Ottoman Empire. Disraeli felt that the meeting of Russia, Germany, and Austria-Hungary had not adequately included Great Britain in the discussions of the crisis, and as such, prevented Britain and Germany from "exchanging opinions." Disraeli drew up his own memorandum because he felt that the three empires were conspiring to disband the Ottoman Empire. He even encouraged Turkey to reject the document and sent a fleet to Besika Bay. He believed that all the provisions were erroneous, for example, he believed that the proposed relief, which the Ottoman Empire was to administer was far beyond the means of the Sultan, and that concentrating troops in any situation would lead to chaos. The cabinet nonetheless approved Disraeli's rejection of the Berlin Memorandum and arguably, the reason why this armistice was unsuccessful, was because it lacked the British approval, which would have given the Berlin Memorandum unanimous support from the western European powers.

== Aftermath ==
Although the Berlin Memorandum made an effort to create a temporary armistice and correct the situation in the Balkans, tensions between the Ottoman Empire and the Christian Balkans continued. After the Ottoman Government was further destabilised following the deposition of Sultan Abdulaziz on May 30, violence escalated again when Montenegro and Serbia both declared war in June. Through the Reichstadt and Budapest Conventions, Russia increasingly sought Austrian diplomatic support in the event of war. Further diplomatic action of the great powers in the Constantinople Conference could thus not prevent the outbreak of the Russo-Turkish War in 1877, which saw Russia involving itself in the crisis protect their Balkan allies.

== See also ==
- Balkanization
- Congress of Berlin
- Eastern question
- Great Eastern Crisis
- International relations (1814–1919)

== Bibliography ==
- Aldred, John. British Imperial and Foreign Policy, 1846-1890. Heinemann Educational Publishers, 2004.

"The Berlin Conference." Press 31 July 1876: p. 3. Papers Past. http://paperspast.natlib.govt.nz/cgi-bin/paperspast?a=d&d=CHP18760731.2.23

- "Correspondence Respecting Affairs in Bosnia and Herzegovina." Parliamentary Papers, 1876, vol.84., retrieved from Mount Holyoke College, https://www.mtholyoke.edu/acad/intrel/andrassy.htm.
- "The Eastern Crisis (1875-1878)." ICRC Resource Centre. ICRC, 4 June 1998. <http://www.icrc.org/eng/resources/documents/misc/57jnvn.htm>.
- Harris, David. A Diplomatic History of the Balkan Crisis of 1875-1878: The First Year. Stanford University Press, 1936.
- Pearce, Malcolm, and Geoffrey Stewart. British Political History, 1867-2001. 3rd ed. New York: Routledge, 2010.
