= Ampelonas (disambiguation) =

Ampelonas (Greek: Αμπελώνας), may refer to several places in Greece:

- Ampelonas, a municipal unit in the Larissa regional unit
- Ampelonas, Elis, a village in the municipality of Pyrgos, Elis
- Ampelonas, Thesprotia, a village in the municipality of Filiates
