= Reichstadt Agreement =

1876 treaty between Austria-Hungary and Russia

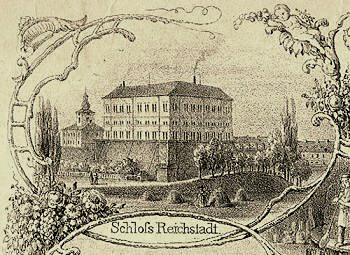
Schloß Reichstadt, Lithograph 1853

On the occasion of the Balkan crisis, Emperor Franz Joseph I of Austria-Hungary and Russian Tsar Alexander II met on 8 July 1876 for secret talks, the results of which were later termed the Reichstadt Agreement (also: Reichstadt Convention) by historians for the sake of brevity. Both emperors were in an alliance with each other and the German Empire in the League of the Three Emperors, or Dreikaiserbund. Present were also the Russian and Austro-Hungarian foreign ministers, Prince Alexander Gorchakov of Russia and Count Gyula Andrássy of Austria-Hungary. The closed meeting took place on July 8 in the Bohemian city of Reichstadt (now Zákupy).

One week after Montenegro's declaration of war on the Ottoman Empire, the monarchs verbally agreed on non-intervention in the Serbian-Ottoman war and in advance on the neutrality of Austria-Hungary in a possible war between Russia and the Ottoman Empire. There are only partially contradictory records of the secret verbal agreement on both sides.

In the event of a victory of the Ottoman Empire over Serbia and Montenegro, it was agreed to restore the pre-war borders. The Christians were to be protected and Montenegro was to become independent within its existing borders. Serbia was not to become independent, but Ottoman fortresses were not to be rebuilt. Administrative reforms were to be carried out in Bosnia and Herzegovina.

In the event of a Serbian and Montenegrin victory, the Balkans were divided into zones of interest, the annexation of Bosnian-Herzegovinian territories by Austria-Hungary and the borders of Balkan states were discussed, although the extent remained unclear

The later Budapest Convention of 1877 confirmed the main points, but when the war concluded with the Treaty of San Stefano in 1878, the terms of the treaty were quite different, which led to Austro-Hungarian insistence on convening a revision at the Congress of Berlin later that year. Those events laid the background for the subsequent Crisis of 1885-1888 and ultimately World War I.

== Format ==
The negotiations took place in a private and almost informal setting. It is significant that the results of the meeting were not written down and so the Austro-Hungarian and the Russian views of what was agreed on differed significantly.

The negotiations in French took place in a private and informal setting due to the need for secrecy. The results of the meeting were not to be recorded or minuted in an official document, particularly at Russia's request. This partly explains why there are differences between the notes taken by the two sides. Andrassy dictated his version to the Russian ambassador in Vienna, Novikov. Independently of this process, Gorchakov dictated a transcript to Alexander Yomini. Neither record was authenticated by the other side.

The scope of the Austrian annexations in Bosnia and Herzegovina in particular was disputed. As a result of these discrepancies, the secret regulations were renegotiated at the Conference of Constantinople and in the Budapest Treaty, but were largely confirmed or supplemented. The Berlin Congress also largely complied with the agreements.

There was never a signed formal convention or even a signed protocol. The minutes were dictated separately by both Andrássy and by Gorchakov, which suggests that neither side really trusted the other. The extent of the agreed Austro-Hungarian annexation in Bosnia and Herzegovina has remained controversial.

== Terms ==
- The Balkan Christians would gain a measure of independence.
- Austria-Hungary would allow Russia to make gains in Bessarabia and the Caucasus.
- Russia would allow Austria-Hungary to gain Bosnia.
- Russia and Austria-Hungary would not create a large Slavic state in the Balkans (Greater Bulgaria or Greater Serbia).

== Implications ==
The agreement effectively meant that Austria-Hungary was assuring Russia that it would stay out of a war between Russia and the Ottoman Empire. It also meant that Austria-Hungary and Russia were agreeing on how the Balkans would be divided in the case of a Russian victory.

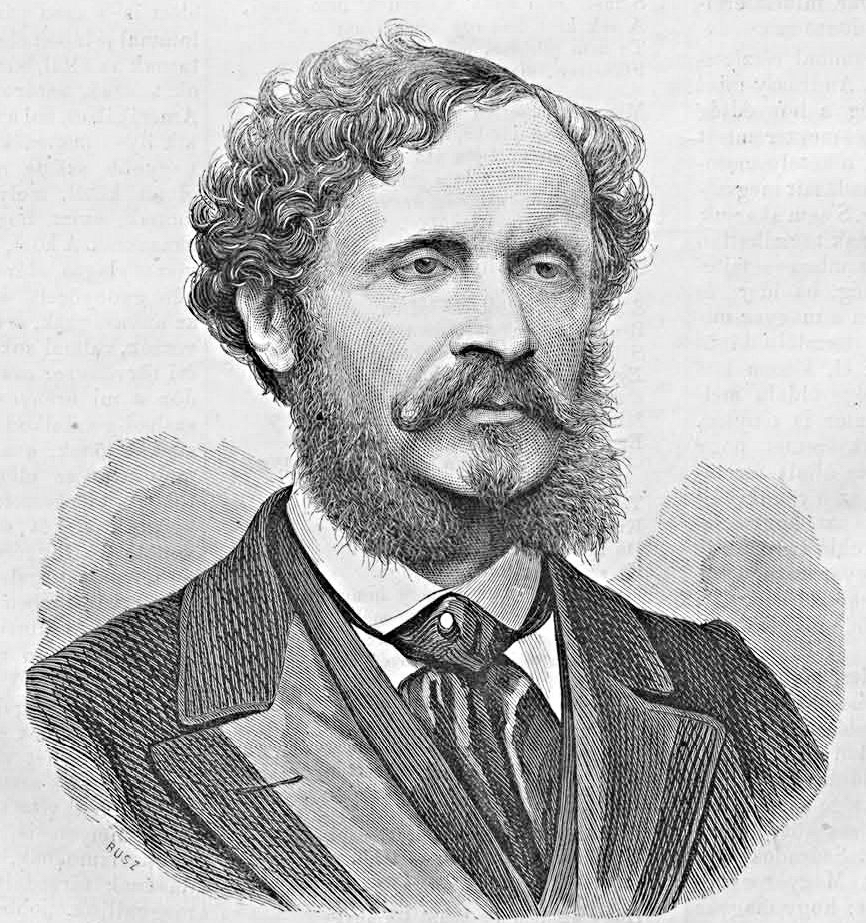
Andrássy

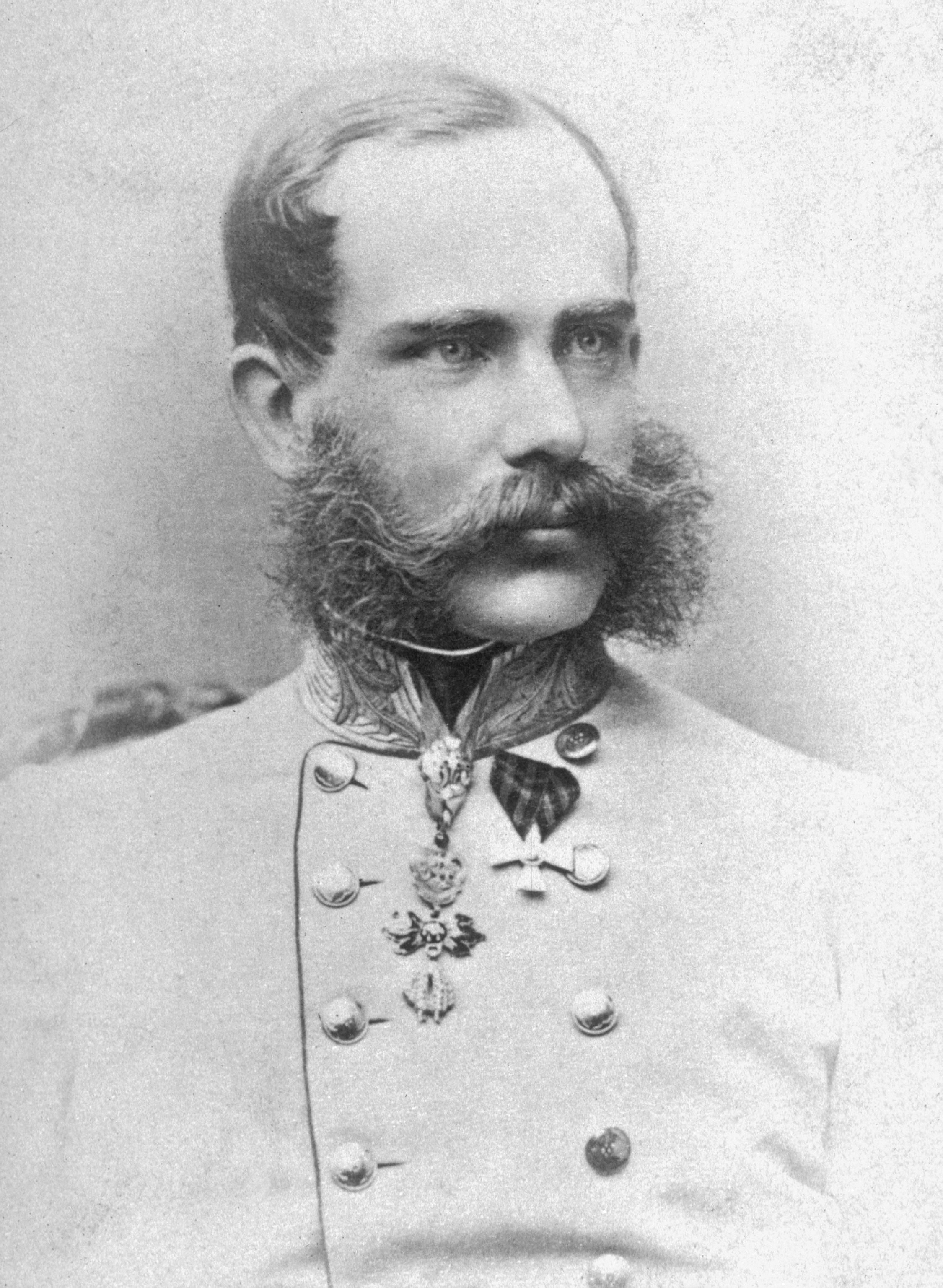
Franz Joseph

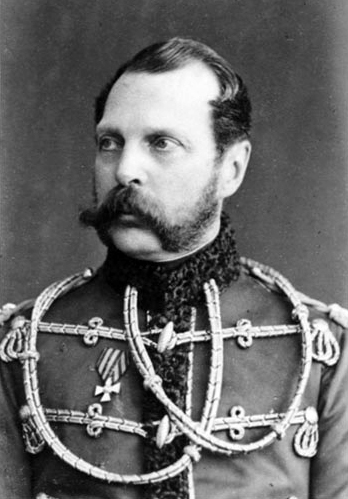
Alexander II

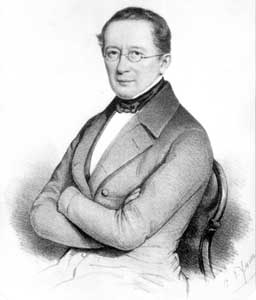
Gorchakov

== Becoming public knowledge ==
According to the will of the parties involved, only the agreement on non-intervention became public knowledge, but not the other agreements. However, contrary to the agreed secrecy, the Russian side informed the Serbian Prince Milan I immediately after the talks that Serbia's territory would not be reduced in the event of defeat.

The secret records and thus the details of the agreements were the subject of conjecture and misjudgement for a long time. After the First World War, the Austrian files of the State Archives were published with the title Résumé des pourparlers secrets de Reichstadt, which Eduard von Wertheimer had already consulted in his biography Count Julius Andrássy, sein Leben und seine Zeit, nach ungedruckten Quellen, vol. 2, published in 1910, and which he analysed in the chapter Entretien de Reichsstadt. According to Wertheimer, the résumé was also called aide-mémoire. The text of the Russian notes was published by the Soviet Union in 1922 and revealed differences to the Austrian notes.

The Austrian records, first published in 1920 by Alfred Francis Pribram, consist of a continuous text with only one column, the Russian records of two columns, the second with comments. It was divided into present and future regulations.

According to George Hoover Rupp, the question of the reasons for the differences in content cannot be clarified. Only in the question of the takeover of Bosnia-Herzegovina by Austria-Hungary does it seem certain that Russia never assumed the annexation of Herzegovina by Austria-Hungary and only agreed to it later under the pressure of the war: ‘Suffice it to say that Russia, feeling Austrian support a sine qua non for the war, at length agreed to the high price exacted.’

Wonder has long been expressed that Russia at Reichstadt so readily agreed to the high price exacted by Austria. It is now disclosed that these terms were in dispute and that Russia agreed to them only after six additional months of negotiation.

== Assessment ==
Bismarck, who only knew the content of the agreements in part and only through oral communications from the Austrian side, stated in his autobiography Gedanken und Erinnerungen that the Convention of Reichstadt, not the Congress of Berlin, was ‘the basis of Austria's possession of Bosnia and Herzegovina and had secured Austria's neutrality for the Russians during their war with the Turks’. Bismarck also assumed that Russia had only sought rapprochement with Austria Hungary after Bismarck had rejected the desire for closer ties between the German Empire and Russia at the expense of Austria in his answer to Tsar Alexander II's ‘doctor question’ from the Russian Livadia Palace.

This declaration of ours, which Gorchakov had induced his master to enforce from us with undoubted clarity in order to prove to him the platonic character of our love, had the consequence that the Russian thunderstorm moved away from Eastern Galicia towards the Balkans, - and that Russia, instead of the negotiations with us, which had been broken off, had, as far as I remember, first of all negotiated with Austria in Pest, in accordance with the agreements of Reichstadt, where the Emperors Alexander and Franz Joseph had met on 8 July 1876. July 1876, with the request that they be kept secret from us.

== See also ==
- Andrássy Note
- Austria–Russia relations
- Balkanization
- Berlin Memorandum
- Bosnian Crisis
- Budapest Convention of 1877
- Bulgarian Crisis (1885–1888)
- Congress of Berlin
- Constantinople Conference
- Eastern question
- Great Eastern Crisis
- International relations (1814–1919)
- Russo-Turkish War (1877–1878)

== Bibliography ==
- Crampton, R. J. A Concise History of Bulgaria. Cambridge University Press 1997
- Beller, Steven. A Concise History of Austria. Cambridge University Press 2007 ISBN 9780521473057
