= Convention of Constantinople (1881) =

International treaty of 1881

Map of the territorial expansion of Greece, with Thessaly and the Arta area marked in light blue

The Convention of Constantinople was signed between the Kingdom of Greece and the Ottoman Empire on 2 July 1881, resulting in the cession of the region of Thessaly (apart from Elassona) and a part of southern Epirus (the Arta Prefecture) to Greece.

== Background ==
With the outbreak of the Great Eastern Crisis in 1875, many in Greece saw an opportunity for realizing the Megali Idea and expanding the borders of the country northward at the expense of the Ottoman Empire. At the same time, the Greek leadership from King George I was aware that the Great Powers, and especially Great Britain, did not favour such adventures; consequently Greece adopted a more cautious stance, particularly given its military unpreparedness. This passivity was reinforced by the fear of Pan-Slavism engendered by the recent crisis over the establishment of the Bulgarian Exarchate, which led to distrust towards suggestions for a co-operation of all Balkan states, particularly by King George. Proposals by Prince Milan I of Serbia for a joint attack and partition of Macedonia on the basis of the Greek–Serbian Alliance of 1867 were thus rebuffed.

As the Eastern Crisis erupted into open warfare with the start of the Serbo-Turkish War in 1876, Russia, which was inexorably drawn towards military intervention in the conflict, moved to secure an arrangement with Austria-Hungary at the Reichstadt Agreement. The Agreement stipulated that a major Slavic state would not be established in the Balkans, that Bulgaria and Albania would become autonomous, and that the three already extant Balkan states—Serbia, Greece, and Montenegro—would annex some territories. For Greece, these were envisaged as Thessaly, Crete, and parts of Epirus. The Greek government under Alexandros Koumoundouros kept to a strict neutrality, in accordance to the wishes of the King. Proposals by Serbia and Romania for a common cause were rebuffed, even though both stressed the need to act to prevent the emergence, under Russian auspices, of a "Greater Bulgaria". As the Powers geared up for the Constantinople Conference, the Greek public turned towards a pro-war stance and clamoured for action. Greece was thrown into a prolonged internal political crisis: the King on the one hand staunchly refused to agree to an alliance with Russia or the Balkan states, while Koumoundouros and his rival, Epameinondas Deligeorgis, alternated in office. The proposals of the Constantinople Conference, although rejected by the Ottoman government, were a shock to the Greek public: despite the "correct" behaviour recommended by the Powers, Greece saw her interests ignored, at the same time as Russia made headway in her plans for a "Greater Bulgaria".

The political situation shifted with the outbreak of the Russo-Turkish War in 1877; Greece began moving toward the possibility of military action. Even King George, disappointed with the British, began to favor a more dynamic policy. However, by the time the Greek government mobilized its forces for an invasion of Thessaly, the uprisings launched in Epirus, Thessaly and Macedonia had been defeated; only in Crete did the uprising continue; and the Russians and Ottomans were negotiating an armistice.

== San Stefano and the Congress of Berlin ==
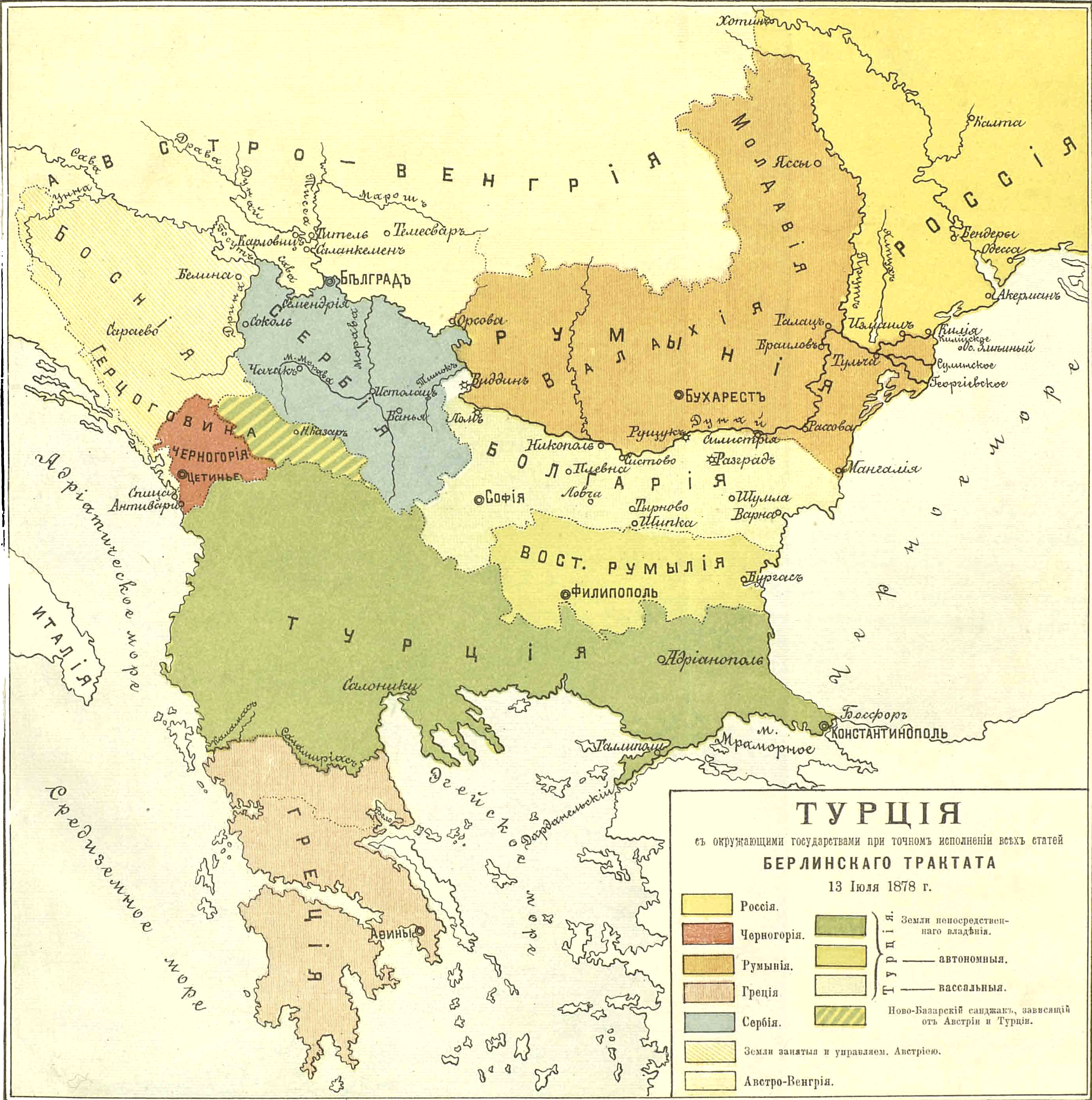
Map of the territorial revisions of the Treaty of Berlin, 1878. Greece's gains were more extensive than the territory actually ceded in 1881

The Treaty of San Stefano caused outrage in Greece. Not only did the new Bulgarian state gain territories that were claimed by Greece and in part inhabited by Greek majorities, but the new Greater Bulgaria, backed by Russia, posed a physical obstacle on the path to the ultimate goal of Greek irredentism: Constantinople. The terms of the treaty also shocked Britain, and caused a turn in British official thinking, away from the dogma of the territorial integrity of the Ottoman Empire—which now was seen as no longer tenable—towards using Greece as a bulwark against Russian-sponsored pan-Slavism. At the same time the British were interested in smoothing over Greek–Ottoman relations, and possibly creating the basis for a Greek–Ottoman co-operation; in view of the public mood in Greece, however, such intentions were unrealistic, and the British began suggesting that Greece, as a reward, might receive territorial compensations. King George suggested the Haliacmon–Aoös line, but although the British government started sounding out the Ottomans about some concessions on the basis of the Kalamas River–Pineios line, it also refused to undertake any firm commitments towards Greece.

Once the Congress of Berlin began, Britain pursued two main aims: the reduction of Bulgaria (and consequently of Russian influence in the Balkans) and the cession of Cyprus. British diplomacy aimed to use the Greek claims as a means to achieve the former, and so already in the first session of the congress, Lord Salisbury proposed the invitation of a Greek representative for matters concerning the "Greek provinces of Turkey"—Crete, Thessaly, Epirus, Macedonia, and Thrace. Facing stiff Russian opposition, in the end a French proposal was adopted in which Greece would be invited to attend only sessions concerning its adjacent territories—Epirus and Thessaly—as well as Crete. The Greek representative, Theodoros Deligiannis, was instructed to claim Epirus and Thessaly, as well as Crete. He was to support those Powers that opposed Bulgarian expansion into Macedonia and Thrace, and if possible secure some sort of autonomy for "remote Greek provinces" under Great Power auspices. The matter of the islands of the eastern Aegean, including the autonomous Principality of Samos, was not to be raised at all. Deligiannis and the Greek ambassador to Berlin, Alexandros Rizos Rangavis, presented the Greek arguments on 29 June. Although Germany and Russia were favourable to a cession of Thessaly and Crete, the Greek claims became a matter for behind-the-scenes trading between the Powers; the British especially used the matter to press Sultan Abdul Hamid II to sign over the cession of Cyprus to Britain, threatening to otherwise throw their support behind the Greek claims. After the Sultan complied, the British delegation turned hostile towards Greek claims. It was only the support of the French foreign minister, William Waddington, that kept the matter alive. Finally, in the Thirteenth Protocol of 5 July 1878, the Powers called on the Porte to agree with Greece a new demarcation of their frontier in Thessaly and Epirus. The Powers proposed the Kalamas–Pineios line, but left the matter deliberately vague and to the discretion of the two governments; only if the latter were not to come to an agreement, the Powers offered to mediate between them.

The Ottoman government, however, refused to implement the protocol's terms, leading Greece and the Empire to the verge of war. In the end, the Great Powers applied pressure on Greece to reduce her claims.

== Treaty ==
On 24 May 1881, the Great Powers and the Ottoman Empire signed a treaty which finalized the new Greco-Turkish border, leading to the incorporation of most of Thessaly (except the Elassona area) and of the area around Arta into Greece. Among other measures, Greece in turn pledged to respect the religious identity and autonomy, as well as the possessions of the sizeable Muslim population in Thessaly (including the private possessions of the Sultan and the Ottoman imperial family). The treaty was ratified by Greece and the Ottoman government on 2 July, when it was signed by the Greek ambassador to Constantinople, Andreas Koundouriotis, and Mahmud Server Pasha, President of the Ottoman Council of State.

== Reactions ==
The cession of Thessaly to Greece sparked protests from a large number of Aromanians. For centuries, transhumant Farsherot (Arvanitovlach) Aromanians from the area of Korçë, Dishnicë and Plasë had migrated to pastures in Thessaly during the winter, but the establishment of a border would make this movement impossible. Fears of cultural assimilation were also expressed. An Aromanian delegation traveled to Constantinople to protest the border change to the Sultan. The delegation had six members: G. Magiari, Ghiți Papahagi, Miha Papagheorge, Vasili Hagisteriu, Dina Gargale and Spiru Balamace. The latter was accompanied by his nephew, future prominent priest Haralambie Balamaci. As a result of the border change, some Aromanians abandoned their ways and settled permanently in Thessaly, which led to an increase of intermarriage between Aromanians and Greeks. Plasë began to enter into decline, leading to the migration of many Aromanians from the village to Romania and the United States.

== Sources ==
- Balamaci, Nick (2013). Born to Assimilate? Thoughts about the Vlachs (PDF). Editura Societății Culturale Aromâne. ISBN 9798218145590.
- Gica, Alexandru (2015). O mare "mică istorie" – Haralambie Balamace (PDF) (in Romanian). Editura Cartea Aromână. ISBN 978-973-8299-58-0.
- Immig, Nicole (2009). "The "New" Muslim Minorities in Greece: Between Emigration and Political Participation, 1881–1886". Journal of Muslim Minority Affairs. 29 (4): 511–522. doi:10.1080/13602000903411408.
- Kofos, Evangelos (1977). "Από το τέλος της Κρητικής Επαναστάσεως ως την προσάρτηση της Θεσσαλίας" [From the End of the Cretan Revolution to the Annexation of Thessaly]. In Christopoulos, Georgios A. & Bastias, Ioannis K. (eds.). Ιστορία του Ελληνικού Έθνους [History of the Greek Nation] (in Greek). Vol. ΙΓ: Νεώτερος Ελληνισμός από το 1833 έως το 1881 [Modern Hellenism from 1833 to 1881]. Athens: Ekdotiki Athinon. pp. 289–365. ISBN 978-960-213-109-1.
