= Mikrolithos =

Mikrolithos Μικρόλιθος
- Settlement
- Location within Greece
- Coordinates: 39°46.8′N 22°24.4′E
- Country: Greece
- Administrative region: Thessaly
- Regional unit: Larissa
- Municipality: Tyrnavos
- Municipal unit: Ampelonas
- Community: Vryotopos
- Elevation: 80 m (260 ft)

Population (2021)
  - Total: 12
- Time zone: UTC+2 (EET)
  - Summer (DST): UTC+3 (EEST)
- Postal code: 415 00
- Area code: +30-2492
- Vehicle registration: PI

Mikrolithos (Greek: Μικρόλιθος, Greek pronunciation: [mik'ɾοliθos]) is a village in the municipality of Tyrnavos. Before the 2011 local government reform it was a part of the municipality of Ampelonas. The 2021 census recorded 12 inhabitants in the village. Mikrolithos is a part of the community of Vryotopos.

== See also ==
- List of settlements in the Larissa regional unit
