= Deleria =

Deleria Δελέρια
- Community
- Location within Greece
- Coordinates: 39°48.2′N 22°20.5′E
- Country: Greece
- Administrative region: Thessaly
- Regional unit: Larissa
- Municipality: Tyrnavos
- Municipal unit: Ampelonas

Area
  - Community: 21.996 km^{2} (8.493 sq mi)
- Elevation: 70 m (230 ft)

Population (2021)
  - Community: 482
  - Density: 21.9/km^{2} (56.8/sq mi)
- Time zone: UTC+2 (EET)
  - Summer (DST): UTC+3 (EEST)
- Postal code: 401 00
- Area code: +30-2492
- Vehicle registration: PI

Deleria (Greek: Δελέρια, Greek pronunciation: [ðe'leɾia]) is a village and a community of the Tyrnavos municipality. Before the 2011 local government reform it was a part of the municipality of Ampelonas. The community of Deleria covers an area of 21.996 km^{2}.

== Population ==
Historical population
Year	Pop.	±%
2001	848	—
2011	655	−22.8%
2021	482	−26.4%

== See also ==
- List of settlements in the Larissa regional unit
