= Rodia, Larissa =

Rodia Ροδιά
- Community
- Location within Greece
- Coordinates: 39°47.9′N 22°22′E
- Country: Greece
- Administrative region: Thessaly
- Regional unit: Larissa
- Municipality: Tyrnavos
- Municipal unit: Ampelonas

Area
  - Community: 66.886 km^{2} (25.825 sq mi)
- Elevation: 70 m (230 ft)

Population (2021)
  - Community: 628
  - Density: 9.39/km^{2} (24.3/sq mi)
- Time zone: UTC+2 (EET)
  - Summer (DST): UTC+3 (EEST)
- Postal code: 401 00
- Area code: +30-2492
- Vehicle registration: PI

Rodia (Greek: Ροδιά, Greek pronunciation: [ɾο'ðʝa]) is a village and a community of the Tyrnavos municipality. Before the 2011 local government reform it was a part of the municipality of Ampelonas. The community of Rodia covers an area of 66.886 km^{2}.

== Population ==
Historical population
Year	Pop.	±%
2001	956	—
2011	732	−23.4%
2021	628	−14.2%

== See also ==
- List of settlements in the Larissa regional unit
