= Vryotopos =

Vryotopos Βρυότοπος
- Community
- Location within Greece
- Coordinates: 39°45.6′N 22°22.5′E
- Country: Greece
- Administrative region: Thessaly
- Regional unit: Larissa
- Municipality: Tyrnavos
- Municipal unit: Ampelonas

Area
  - Community: 27.245 km^{2} (10.519 sq mi)
- Elevation: 71 m (233 ft)

Population (2021)
  - Community: 557
  - Density: 20.4/km^{2} (53.0/sq mi)
- Time zone: UTC+2 (EET)
  - Summer (DST): UTC+3 (EEST)
- Postal code: 404 00
- Area code: +30-2492
- Vehicle registration: PI

Vryotopos (Greek: Βρυότοπος, Greek pronunciation: [vɾi'οtopos]) is a village and a community of the Tyrnavos municipality. Before the 2011 local government reform it was a part of the municipality of Ampelonas. The community of Vryotopos covers an area of 27.245 km^{2}.

== Administrative division ==
The community of Vryotopos consists of two separate settlements:

- Mikrolithos (population 12 in 2021)
- Vryotopos (population 545)

== Population ==
Historical population
Year	Pop.	±%
2001	660	—
2011	585	−11.4%
2021	557	−4.8%

== See also ==
- List of settlements in the Larissa regional unit
