= Sadullah Pasha =

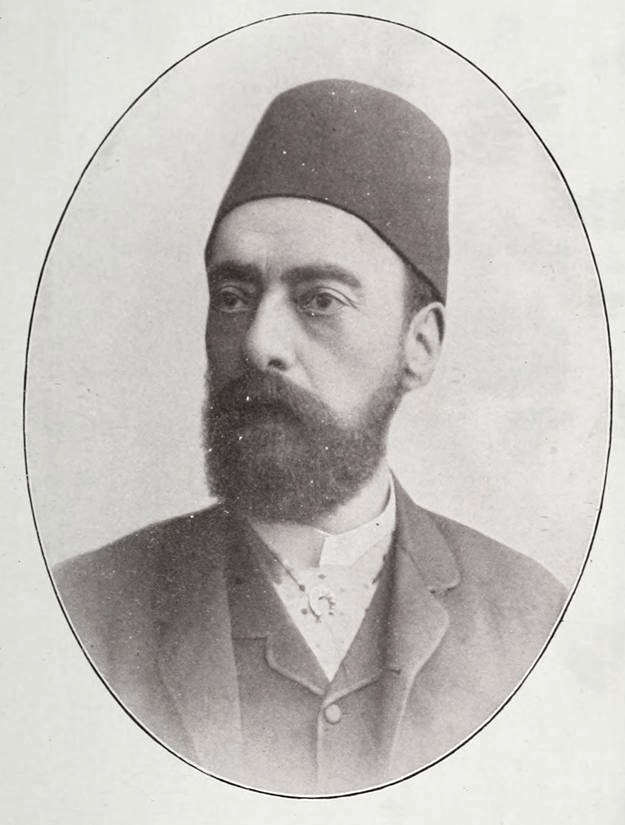

Personal details
- Born: 1838 Erzurum, Ottoman Empire (modern Turkey)
- Died: 14 January 1891 (aged 52–53) Vienna, Austria-Hungary (modern Austria)

Sadullah Pasha (1838 – 14 January 1891) was an Ottoman statesman in the late Tanzimat period. He is most notable as the Ottoman ambassador to Berlin following the aftermath of the Russo-Turkish War of 1877–78.

== Early life and career ==
Sadullah Pasha was born in 1838 in Erzurum, as the son of Assad Muhlis Pasha. After completing his primary education he learned Arabic, Persian and French. He also took private lessons on French and Eastern literature.

In 1853, he began to work for the state. First, he worked at the "Financial Wage Cattle". In 1856, he worked in the Translation Office. In 1866 he was appointed to the "Mezahib Kalemi". In 1868, he was made the "Chief of the Ministry of State Education". In 1870, he was made "Principal State Attache". From April 4, 1876, to May 30, 1876, he served as the Trade and Agriculture Minister.

He along with Saffet Pasha was a representative of the Ottoman Empire at the Congress of Berlin, to determine the territories of the states in the Balkan Peninsula following the Russo-Turkish War of 1877–78. The delegation in which he took part was successful in changing the San Stefano peace terms in favour of the Ottoman Empire (Treaty of Berlin).

He wrote the poem "The Nineteenth Century," which was much-cited at the time.

Sadullah Pasha committed suicide in Vienna in 1891.
