= Gerhard Herm =

German journalist and writer

Gerhard Herm (26 April 1931, in Crailsheim, Württemberg, Germany – 9 March 2014, in Ottobrunn) was a German journalist and writer.

He studied at the Werner Friedmann Institute and received a grant from the Fulbright Program to study in the USA. In connection with his studies, Herm was given a position as a journalist at Tagesschau television. Later he switched to WDR and published his first book in 1964. During his time in television, he participated in the production of forty documentary programmes. In addition to his work in television, radio plays, and features he has written a number of works of fiction and non-fiction.

== Works ==
Non-fiction

- Amerika erobert Europa. Econ, Düsseldorf 1964
- Die Diadochen
- Die Kelten. Econ, Düsseldorf 1975;
  — English translation: The Celts: The People Who Came Out of the Darkness, Book Club Associates, London 1975;
  — English translation: The Celts: The People Who Came Out of the Darkness, St. Martin's Press, New York 2002, ISBN 9780312313432).
- Die Phönizier. Das Purpurreich der Antike. Rowohlt, Reinbek 1987, ISBN 3-499-18387-0;
  — English translation: The Phoenicians: The Purple Empire of the Ancient World, 1975;
  — French translation: Les Phéniciens, Fayard, Paris 2002, ISBN 9782213598451.
- Des Reiches Herrlichkeit
- Die Diadochen: Alexanders Erben kampfen um d. Weltherrschaft. Bertelsmann, Gütersloh 1978, ISBN 9783570004340
- Strahlend in Purpur und Gold: D. heilige Reich von Konstantinopel. Econ, Düsseldorf 1979, ISBN 9783430144551
- Amerika ist an allem schuld: Die Amerikanisierung der Alten Welt. Heyne, Munich 1980, ISBN 9783453013063
- Karl der Grosse. Econ, Düsseldorf 1987, ISBN 3-430-14457-4
- Deutschland-Rußland. 1000 Jahre einer seltsamen Freundschaft. Rasch & Röhring, Hamburg 1990, ISBN 3-89136-300-1
- Der Aufstieg des Hauses Habsburg. Econ, Düsseldorf 1994, ISBN 3-430-14448-5
- Glanz und Niedergang des Hauses Hohenzollern. Econ, Düsseldorf 1996, ISBN 3-430-14459-0

Fiction

- Sturm Am Goldenen Horn. Hoffmann & Campe, Hamburg 1982, ISBN 978-3-455-02810-2
- Adam Horners Söhne. Hoffmann & Campe, Hamburg 1985, ISBN 3-612-65046-7
- Die Frau von Alexandria.. Econ, Düsseldorf 1997, ISBN 3-612-27283-7.
- Octavia, die Römerin.. von Schröder Verlag, Düsseldorf 1997, ISBN 3-547-74444-X
- Der Assassine. List, München 2000, ISBN 3-612-65046-7
- Brockmeyers schönste Morde. Baier-Verlag, 2004
