= Ampelonas =

Ampelonas Αμπελώνας
- Municipal unit
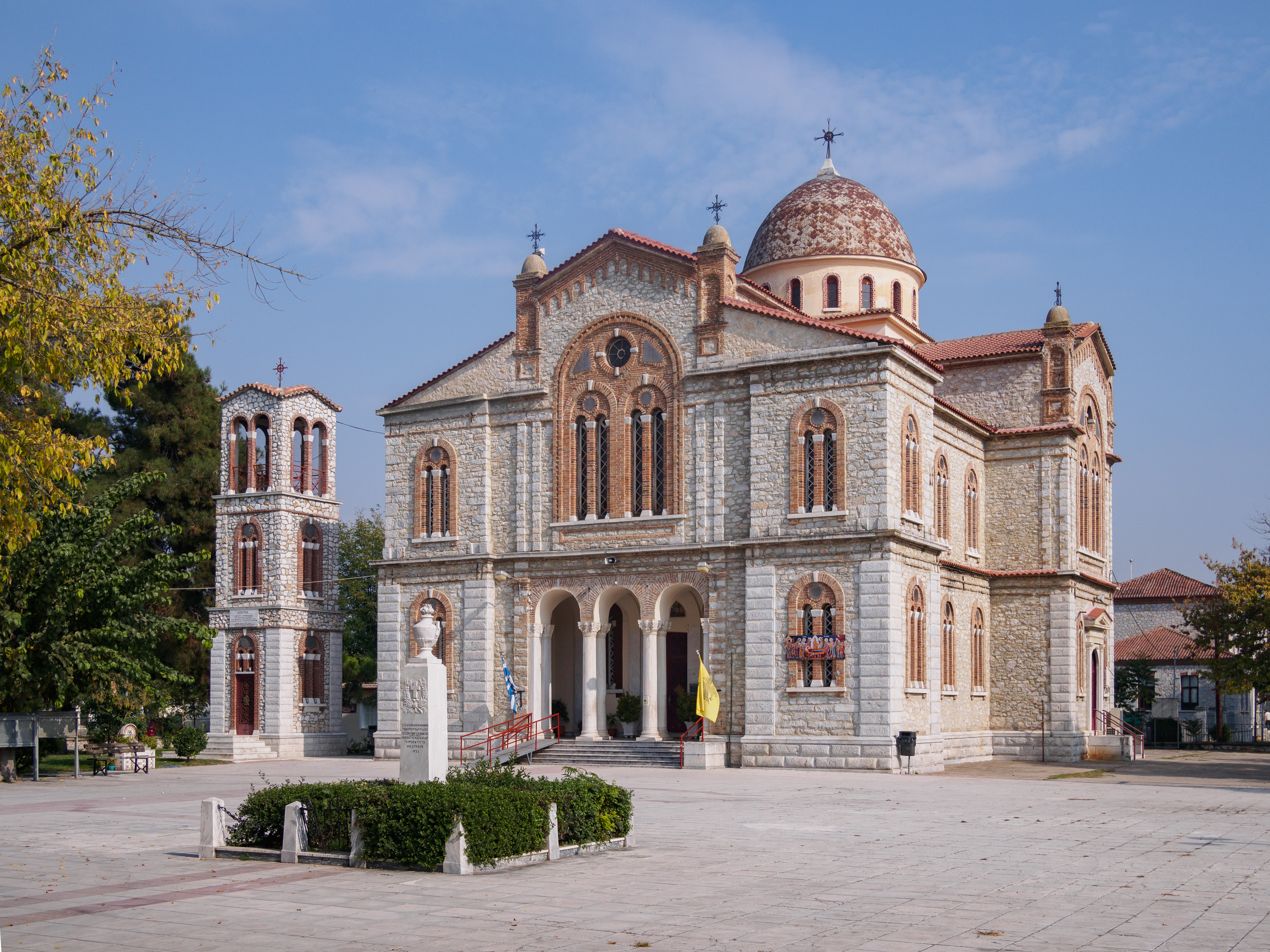
- The church of the Dormition of Theotokos in Ampelonas

- Location within the regional unit

- Location within Greece
- Coordinates: 39°44.8′N 22°21.7′E
- Country: Greece
- Administrative region: Thessaly
- Regional unit: Larissa
- Municipality: Tyrnavos

Area
  - Municipal unit: 154.759 km^{2} (59.753 sq mi)
  - Community: 38.632 km^{2} (14.916 sq mi)
- Elevation: 70 m (230 ft)

Population (2021)
  - Municipal unit: 7,257
  - Municipal unit density: 46.89/km^{2} (121.5/sq mi)
  - Community: 5,590
  - Community density: 145/km^{2} (375/sq mi)
- Time zone: UTC+2 (EET)
  - Summer (DST): UTC+3 (EEST)
- Postal code: 404 00
- Area code: +30-2492
- Vehicle registration: PI

Ampelonas (Greek: Αμπελώνας, Greek pronunciation: [abe'lonas]) is a village and a municipal unit of the Tyrnavos municipality. Before the 2011 local government reform it was an independent municipality. The community of Ampelonas covers an area of 38.632 km^{2} while the respective municipal unit covers an area of 154.759 km^{2}.

== Administrative division ==
The municipali unit of Ampelonas consists of four communities:

- Ampelonas (population 6,083)
- Deleria (population 655)
- Rodia (population 732)
- Vryotopos (population 585)

== History ==
Ampelonas was founded in the first quarter of the 15th century, when the Ottoman sultan Murad II settled 5,000–6,000 Yörüks from Konya in the area of Ampelonas. Following the 1881 Convention of Constantinople and the cession of Thessaly to Greece, the Turks of the village sold their properties and immigrated to Asia Minor, while Greeks moved in the area. Until 1928 the village was named Kazaklar (Greek: Καζακλάρ, Greek pronunciation: [kazak'laɾ]).

== Economy ==
Ampelonas is a rural area and its main products are grapes, wine and tsipouro. The Ampelonas Wine Festival has been held annually in the village since 1959. Cotton, cereals, corn, almonds, pears and peaches are grown in the area. Moreover, there are cultivations of fruits and vegetables like cabbages, peppers, tomatoes, melons and watermelons.

== Population ==
Historical population
Year	Pop.	±%
2001	8,463	—
2011	8,055	−4.8%
2021	7,257	−9.9%

== See also ==
- List of settlements in the Larissa regional unit
