= Congress of Berlin =

1878 meeting of representatives of the major European powers

Coordinates: 52°30′42″N 13°22′55″E

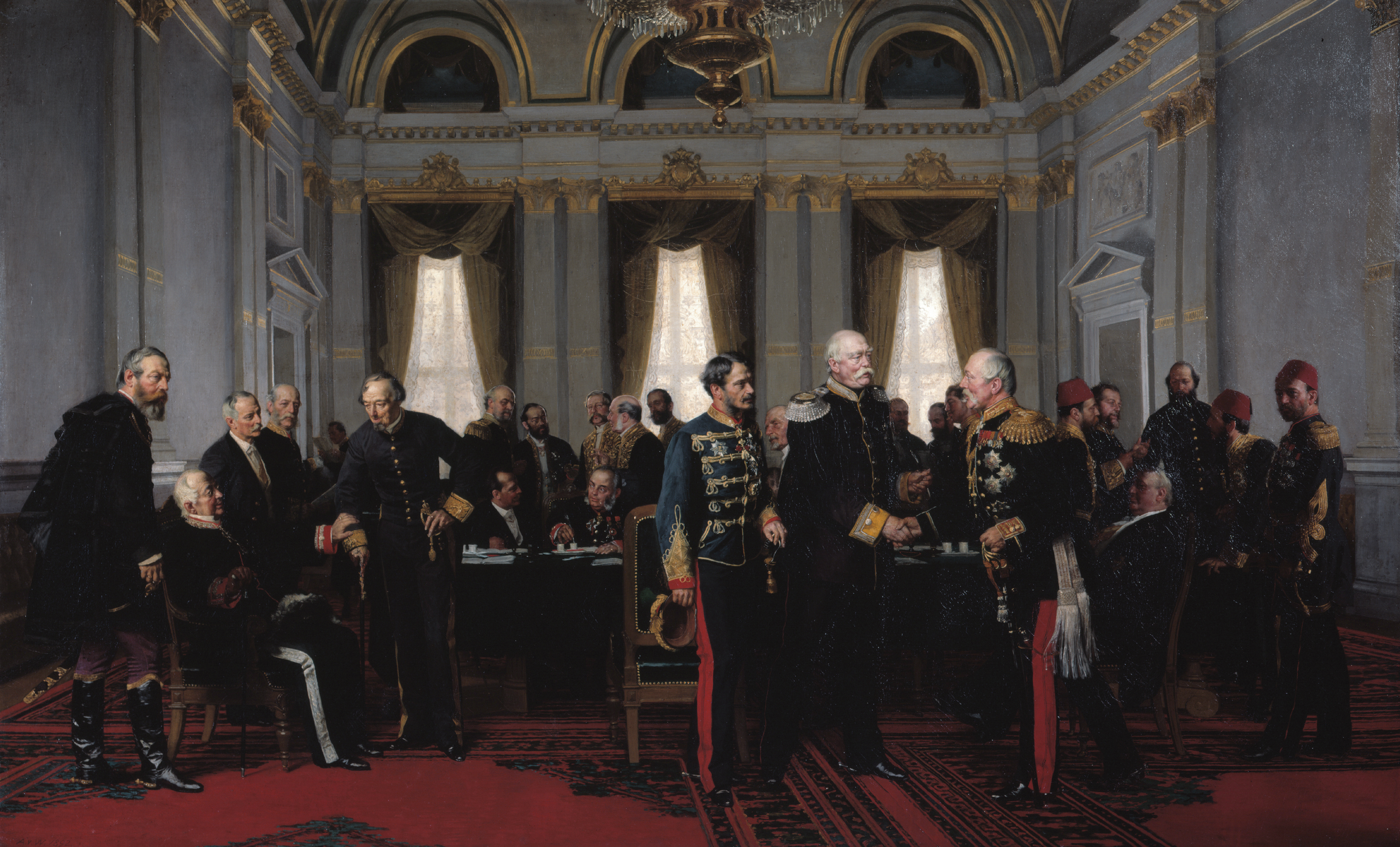
Anton von Werner's painting, Congress of Berlin (1881), depicting the final meeting at the Reich Chancellery on 13 July 1878. Bismarck (representing Germany) is shown in the centre, between Gyula Andrássy (Austria-Hungary) and Pyotr Shuvalov (Russia). On the left are Alajos Károlyi (Austria-Hungary), Alexander Gorchakov (Russia) (seated) and Benjamin Disraeli (Great Britain). On the far right is the Ottoman delegation; showing from left to right, Sadullah Pasha, Karatheodori Pasha, and Mehmed Ali Pasha.

At the Congress of Berlin (13 June – 13 July 1878), the major European powers revised the territorial and political terms imposed by the Russian Empire on the Ottoman Empire by the Treaty of San Stefano (March 1878), which had ended the Russo-Turkish War of 1877–1878. The Congress was the result of escalating tensions, particularly British opposition to Russian hegemony over the Ottoman Empire in the Balkans through the creation of a Russian-aligned 'Greater Bulgaria'. To secure the European balance of power in favour of its splendid isolation achieved after the Crimean War, Britain stationed the Mediterranean Fleet near Constantinople to enforce British demands. To avoid war, Otto von Bismarck, Chancellor of the newly formed German Empire, was asked to mediate a solution that would restore the Ottoman Empire's position as a counterbalance to Russian influence in the Mediterranean and the Balkans, in line with the principles of the 1856 Treaty of Paris.

Attended by delegates from Europe's then six great powers: Russia, Great Britain, France, Austria-Hungary, Italy, and Germany; the Ottomans as well as representatives of four Balkan states (Greece, Serbia, Romania and Montenegro), the Congress culminated in the Treaty of Berlin (13 July 1878). This agreement essentially dismantled the autonomous Greater Bulgarian State envisaged at San Stefano, and reorganised the borders of south-eastern Europe. The main results were the Austro-Hungarian forcible occupation of Bosnia and Herzegovina, the British de facto annexation of Cyprus under false pretenses, and the formal recognition of the self-declared independence of Romania, Serbia and Montenegro; allies of Russia in the previous war. While the settlement averted war, it exacerbated nationalist grievances in the Balkans and deepened the rivalry between Britain and Russia (The Great Game), contributing to long-term regional instability that foreshadowed the Balkan Wars and World War I.

As mediator of the Congress, Otto von Bismarck negotiated along the lines laid down by Britain in its secret negotiations before the Congress. He also wanted to avoid Russian domination of the Balkans, or the formation of a Greater Bulgaria, and to keep Constantinople in Ottoman hands. Finally, Bismarck helped to secure civil rights for Jews in the region, as a precondition for international recognition of the newly formed states. The Congress took place at Reich Chancellery, Wilhelmstrasse.

The affected territories were instead granted varying degrees of independence. Romania became fully independent, though was forced to give part of Bessarabia to Russia, and gained Northern Dobruja. Serbia and Montenegro were also granted full independence but lost territory, with Austria-Hungary occupying the Sanjak of Novi Pazar along with Bosnia and Herzegovina. Britain took possession of Cyprus. Of the territory that remained within the Ottoman Empire, Bulgaria was made a semi-independent principality, Eastern Rumelia became a special administration, and the region of Macedonia was returned to the Ottomans on condition of reforms to its governance.

The results were initially hailed as a success for peace in the region, but most of the participants were not satisfied with the outcome. The Ottomans were humiliated and had their weakness confirmed as the "sick man of Europe". Russia resented the lack of rewards, despite having won the war that the conference was supposed to resolve, and felt humiliated by the other great powers in their rejection of the San Stefano settlement. Serbia, Bulgaria and Greece all received far less than they thought they deserved, especially Bulgaria which was left with less than half of the territory envisioned by the Treaty of San Stefano. Bismarck became hated by Russian nationalists and Pan-Slavists, and later found that he had tied Germany too closely to Austria-Hungary in the Balkans. Although Austria-Hungary gained substantial territory, this angered the South Slavs and led to decades of tensions in Bosnia and Herzegovina, culminating in the assassination of Archduke Franz Ferdinand.

In the long term, the settlement led to rising tensions between Russia and Austria-Hungary, and disputes over nationalism in the Balkans. Grievances with the results of the congress festered until they exploded in the First and Second Balkan Wars (1912 and 1913 respectively). Continuing nationalism in the Balkans was a major factor for the First World War in 1914.

== Background ==
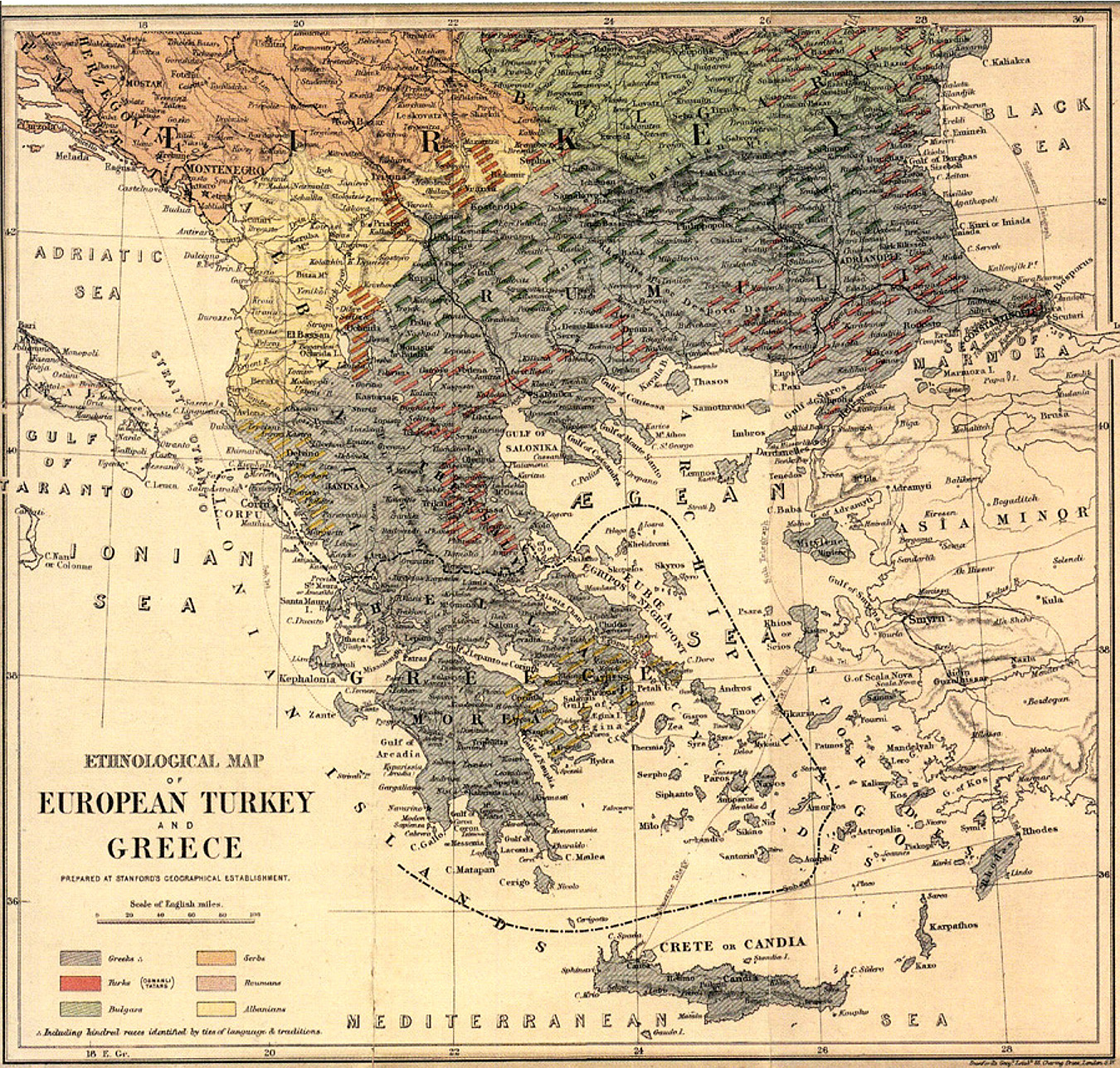
Pro-Greek ethnic map of the Balkans by Ioannis Gennadius, published by the English cartographer E. Stanford in 1877

In the decades leading up to the congress, Russia and the Balkans had been gripped by Pan-Slavism, a movement to unite all the Balkan Slavs under one rule. The Treaty of San Stefano, which had created a "Greater Bulgaria", was opposed as a display of Pan-Slavic hegemonic ambition in southeastern Europe. In Imperial Russia, Pan-Slavism meant the creation of a unified Slavic state, under Russian direction, and was essentially a byword for Russian conquest of the Balkan peninsula. The realisation of the goal would have given Russia control of the Dardanelles and the Bosphorus, thus economic control of the Black Sea and substantially greater geopolitical power. Pan-Germanism and Pan-Italianism reflected similar nationalist desires and had resulted in two unifications; it took different forms in the various Slavic nations.

Balkan Slavs felt they needed both an equivalent to Piedmont to serve as a base and an outside sponsor corresponding to France. The state that was meant to serve as the locus for unification of the Balkans under a "Slavic" rule was not always clear, as initiative wafted between Serbia and Bulgaria. Italian rhetoric by contrast cast Romania as Latin, a "second Piedmont".

The recognition of the Bulgarian Exarchate by the Ottomans in 1870 had been intended to separate the Bulgarians, religiously from the Ecumenical Patriarch of Constantinople, and politically from Serbia. Pan-Slavism required the end of Ottoman rule in the Balkans. How and whether that goal would be realised was the major question to be answered at the Congress of Berlin.

== Great powers in the Balkans ==
The Balkans were a major stage for competition between the European great powers in the second half of the 19th century. Britain and Russia had interests in the fate of the Balkans. Russia was interested in the region, both ideologically, as a pan-Slavist unifier, and practically, to secure greater control of the Mediterranean. Britain was interested in preventing Russia from accomplishing its goals. Furthermore, the Unifications of Italy and of Germany had stymied the ability of a third European power, Austria-Hungary, to expand its domain to the southwest any further. Germany, as the most powerful continental nation since the 1871 Franco-Prussian War had little direct interest in the settlement and so was the only power that could mediate the Balkan question credibly.

Russia and Austria-Hungary, the two powers that were most invested in the fate of the Balkans, were allied with Germany in the conservative League of Three Emperors, which had been founded to preserve the monarchies of Continental Europe. The Congress of Berlin was thus mainly a dispute among supposed allies of Bismarck. The German Empire, the arbiter of the discussion, would thus have to choose before the end of the congress which of their allies to support. That decision was to have direct consequences on the future of European geopolitics.

Ottoman brutality in the Serbian–Ottoman War and the violent suppression of the Herzegovina Uprising fomented political pressure within Russia, which saw itself as the protector of the Serbs, to act against the Ottoman Empire. David MacKenzie writes that within Russia "sympathy for the Serbian Christians existed in Court circles, among nationalist diplomats, and in the lower classes, and was actively expressed through the Slav committees".

Eventually, Russia sought and obtained Austria-Hungary's pledge of benevolent neutrality in the coming war, in return for ceding Bosnia Herzegovina to Austria-Hungary in the Budapest Convention of 1877. act: The Berlin Congress in effect postponed resolution of the Bosnian question and left Bosnia and Herzegovina under Habsburg control. This was the goal of Austro-Hungarian Foreign Minister Count Gyula Andrássy.

== Treaty of San Stefano ==
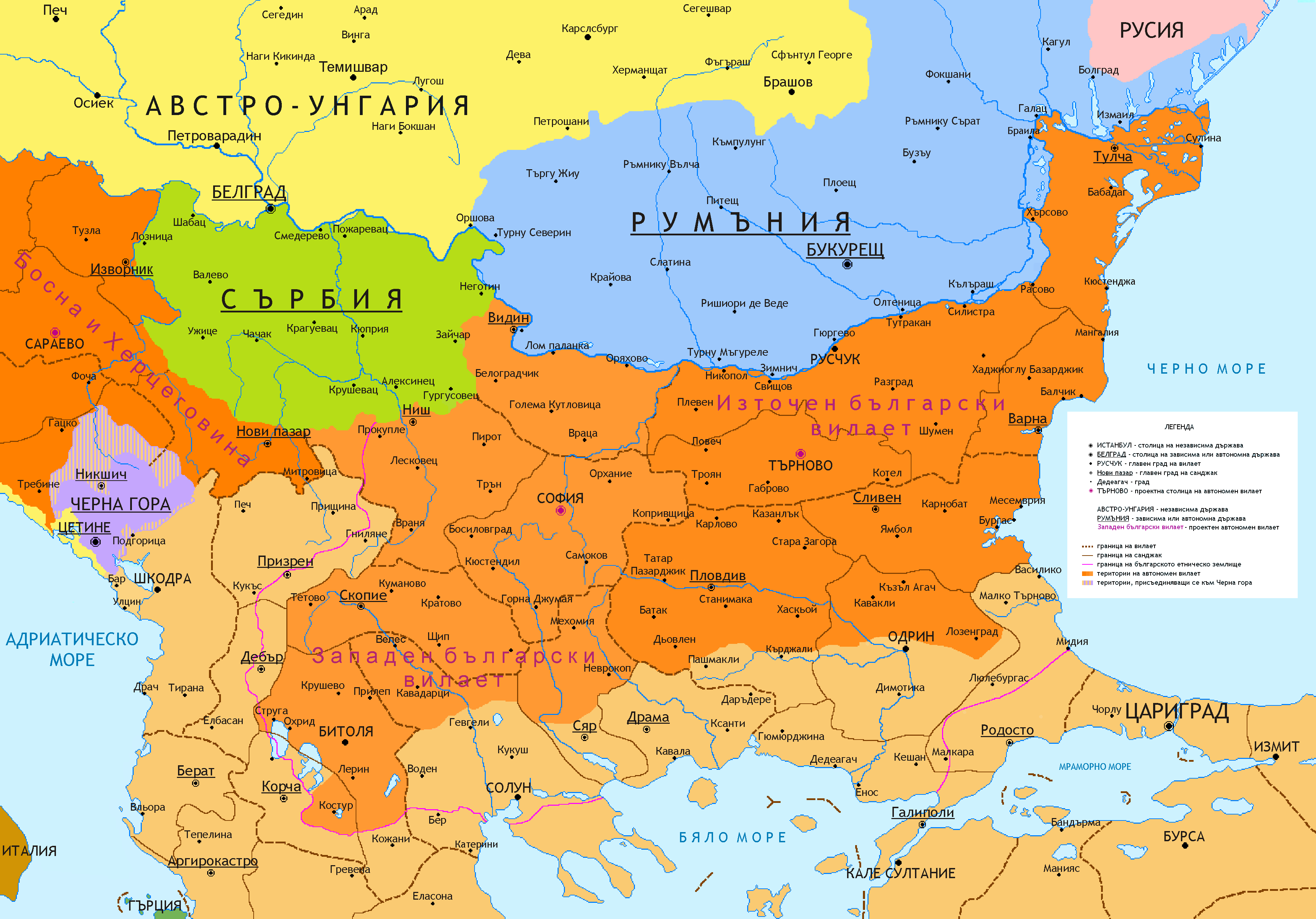
Bulgaria after the Conference of Constantinople, 1876

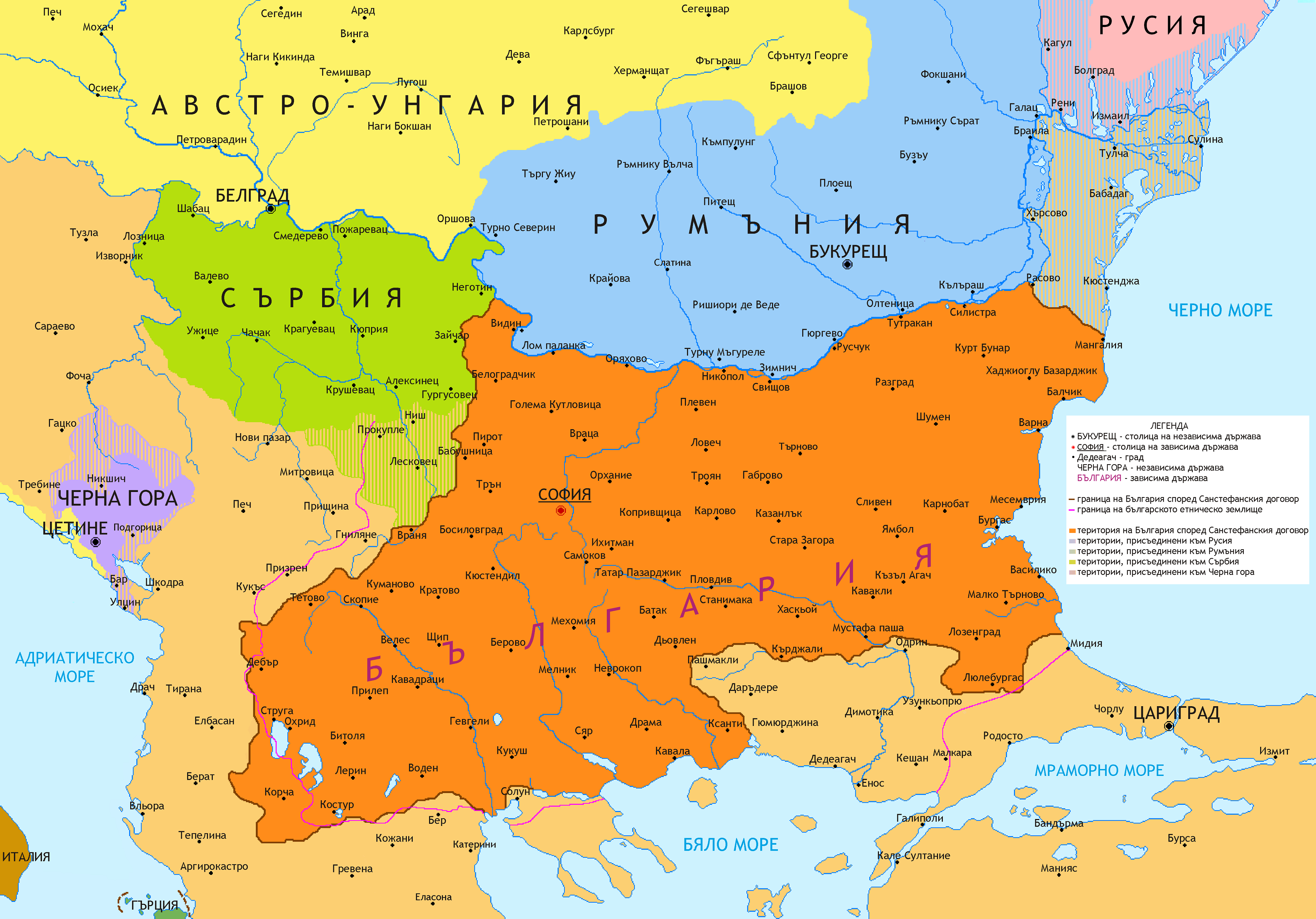
Bulgaria after the Treaty of San Stefano, 1878

After the Bulgarian April Uprising in 1876 and the Russian victory in the Russo-Turkish War of 1877–1878, Russia had liberated almost all of the Ottoman European possessions. The Ottomans recognised Montenegro, Romania and Serbia as independent, and the territories of all three of them were expanded. Russia created a large Principality of Bulgaria as an autonomous vassal of the sultan. That expanded Russia's sphere of influence to encompass the entire Balkans, which alarmed other powers in Europe. Britain, which had threatened war with Russia if it occupied Constantinople, and France did not want another power meddling in either the Mediterranean or the Middle East, where both powers were prepared to make large colonial gains. Austria-Hungary desired Habsburg control over the Balkans, and Germany wanted to prevent its ally from going to war. German Chancellor Otto von Bismarck thus called the Congress of Berlin to discuss the partition of the Ottoman Balkans among the European powers and to preserve the League of Three Emperors in the face of the spread of European liberalism.

The Congress was attended by Britain, Austria-Hungary, France, Germany, Italy, Russia and the Ottoman Empire. Delegates from Greece, Romania, Serbia and Montenegro attended the sessions that concerned their states, but they were not members.

The Congress was solicited by Russia's rivals, particularly Austria-Hungary and Britain, and was hosted in 1878 by Bismarck. It proposed and ratified the Treaty of Berlin. The meetings were held at Bismarck's Reich Chancellery, the former Radziwill Palace, from 13 June to 13 July 1878. The congress revised or eliminated 18 of the 29 articles in the Treaty of San Stefano. Furthermore, by using as a foundation the Treaties of Paris (1856) and of Washington (1871), the treaty rearranged the East.

== Other powers' fear of Russian influence ==
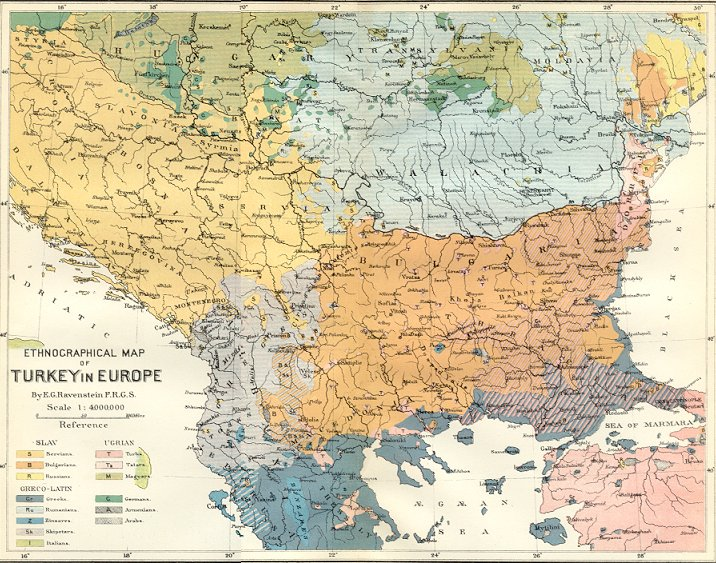
Ethnic composition map of the Balkans by the German-English cartographer Ernst Georg Ravenstein of 1870

The principal mission of the participants at the Congress was to deal a fatal blow to the burgeoning movement of pan-Slavism. The movement caused serious concern in Berlin and even more so in Vienna, which was afraid that the repressed Slavic nationalities would revolt against the Habsburgs. The British and the French governments were nervous about both the diminishing influence of the Ottoman Empire and the cultural expansion of Russia to the south, where both Britain and France were poised to colonise Egypt and Palestine. By the Treaty of San Stefano, the Russians, led by Foreign Minister Alexander Gorchakov, had managed to create in Bulgaria an autonomous principality, under the nominal rule of the Ottoman Empire.

That sparked the Great Game, the massive British fear of the growing Russian influence in the Middle East. The new principality, including a very large portion of Macedonia as well as access to the Aegean Sea, could easily threaten the Dardanelles Straits, which separate the Black Sea from the Mediterranean Sea.

The arrangement was not acceptable to the British, who considered the entire Mediterranean to be a British sphere of influence and saw any Russian attempt to gain access there as a grave threat to British power. On 4 June, before the Congress opened on 13 June, British Prime Minister Lord Beaconsfield (Disraeli) had already concluded the Cyprus Convention, a secret alliance with the Ottomans against Russia in which Britain was allowed to occupy the strategically-placed island of Cyprus. The agreement predetermined Beaconsfield's position during the Congress and led him to issue threats to unleash a war against Russia if it did not comply with Ottoman demands.

Negotiations between Austro-Hungarian Foreign Minister Gyula Andrássy and British Foreign Secretary Marquess of Salisbury had already "ended on 6 June by Britain agreeing to all the Austrian proposals relative to Bosnia-Herzegovina about to come before the congress while Austria would support British demands".

== Bismarck as host ==
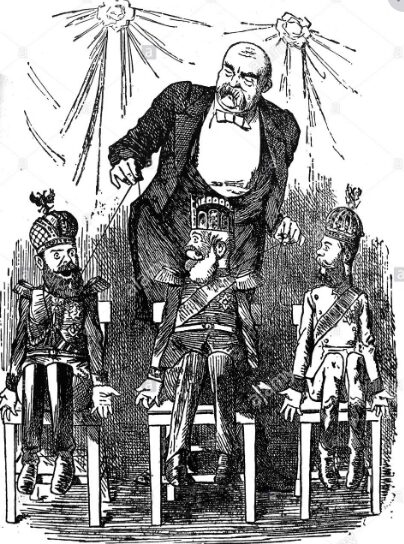
Bismarck manipulates the emperors of Austria, Germany & Russia like a ventriloquist's puppets.

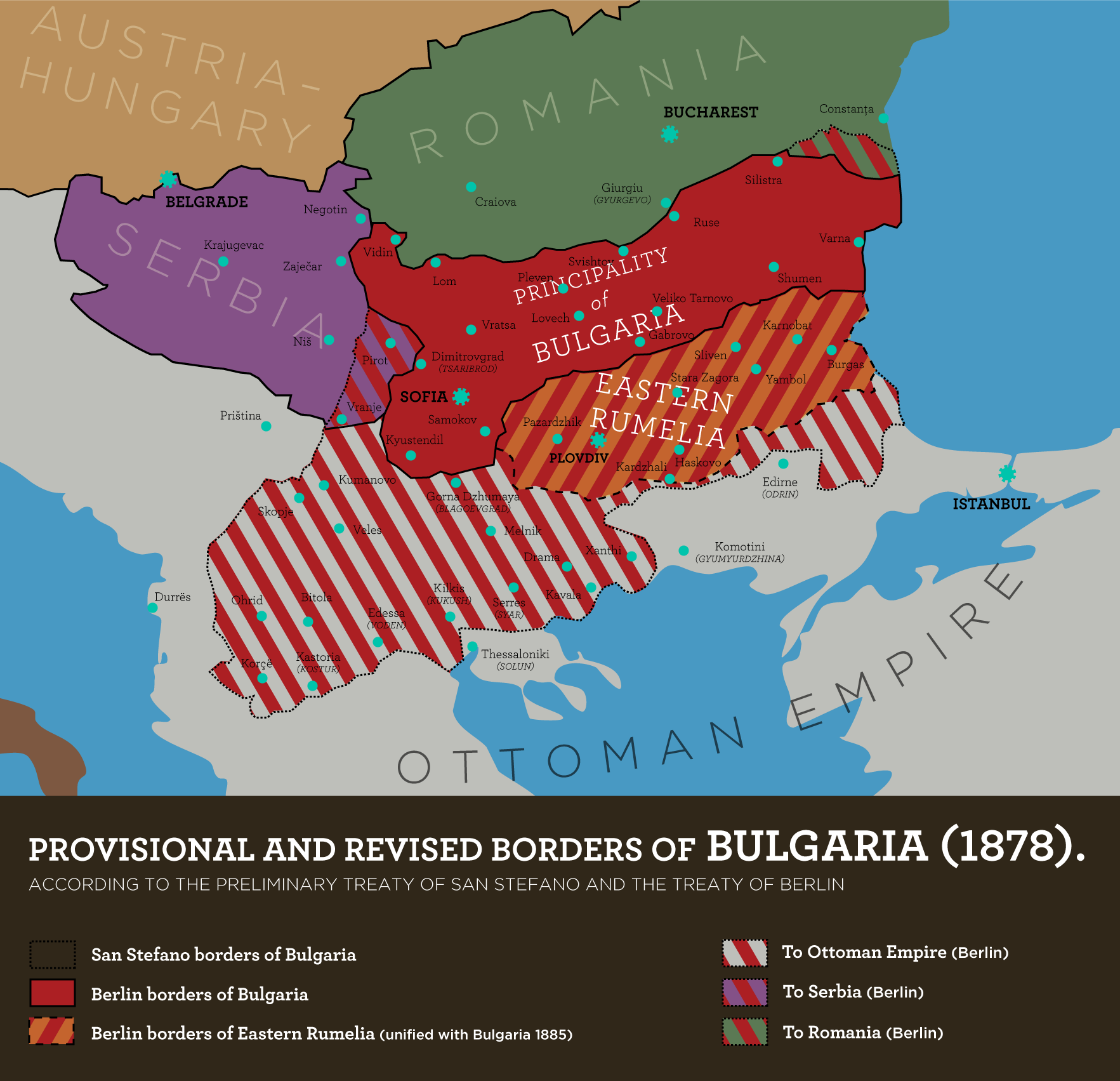
Borders of Bulgaria according to the preliminary Treaty of San Stefano (red stripes) and the superseding Treaty of Berlin (solid red)

The Congress of Berlin is frequently viewed as the culmination of the battle between Alexander Gorchakov of Russia and Otto von Bismarck of Germany. Both were able to persuade other European leaders that a free and independent Bulgaria would greatly improve the security risks posed by a disintegrating Ottoman Empire. According to historian Erich Eyck, Bismarck supported Russia's position that "Turkish rule over a Christian community (Bulgaria) was an anachronism which undoubtedly gave rise to insurrection and bloodshed and should therefore be ended". He used the Great Eastern Crisis of 1875 as proof of growing animosity in the region.

Bismarck's ultimate goal during the Congress of Berlin was not to upset Germany's status on the international platform. He did not wish to disrupt the League of the Three Emperors by choosing between Russia and Austria as an ally. To maintain peace in Europe, Bismarck sought to convince other European diplomats that dividing up the Balkans would foster greater stability. One reason that Bismarck was able to mediate the various tensions at the Congress of Berlin was his diplomatic persona. He sought peace and stability when international affairs did not pertain to Germany directly. Since he viewed the current situation in Europe as favourable for Germany, any conflicts between the major European powers that threatened the status quo was against German interests. Also, at the Congress of Berlin, "Germany could not look for any advantage from the crisis" that had occurred in the Balkans in 1875. Therefore, Bismarck claimed impartiality on behalf of Germany at the Congress, which enabled him to preside over the negotiations with a keen eye for foul play.

Though most of Europe went into the Congress expecting a diplomatic show, much like the Congress of Vienna, they were to be sadly disappointed. Bismarck, unhappy to be conducting the Congress in the heat of the summer, had a short temper and a low tolerance for malarky. Thus, any grandstanding was cut short by the testy German chancellor. The ambassadors from the small Balkan territories whose fate was being decided were barely even allowed to attend the diplomatic meetings, which were between mainly the representatives of the great powers.

According to Henry Kissinger, the congress saw a shift in Bismarck's Realpolitik. Until then, as Germany had become too powerful for isolation, his policy was to maintain the League of the Three Emperors. Now that he could no longer rely on Russia's alliance, he began to form relations with as many potential enemies as possible.

== Legacy ==
Owing to Russia's insistence, Romania, Serbia and Montenegro were all given the status of independent principalities. Russia recovered Southern Bessarabia, which it had annexed at the end of the Russo-Turkish War of 1806–1812, and lost to Moldavia/Romania in 1856, after the end of the Crimean War. The Bulgarian state that Russia had created by the Treaty of San Stefano was divided into the Principality of Bulgaria and Eastern Rumelia, both of which were given nominal autonomy, under the control of the Ottoman Empire. Bulgaria was promised autonomy, and guarantees were made against Turkish interference, but they were largely ignored. Romania received Northern Dobruja as a compensation for Southern Bessarabia, but even so it did not benefit of substantial gain of territory despite its consistent war effort alongside Russia. Romanians deeply resented the loss of Southern Bessarabia and Russo-Romanian relationship remained very cold for decades. Montenegro obtained Nikšić, Podgorica, Bar and Plav-Gusinje. The Ottoman government, or Porte, agreed to obey the specifications contained in the Organic Law of 1868 and to guarantee the civil rights of non-Muslim subjects. The region of Bosnia-Herzegovina was handed over to the administration of Austria-Hungary, which also obtained the right to garrison the Sanjak of Novi Pazar, a small border region between Montenegro and Serbia. Bosnia and Herzegovina were put on the fast track to eventual annexation. Russia agreed that Macedonia, the most important strategic section of the Balkans, was too multinational to be part of Bulgaria and permitted it to remain under the Ottoman Empire. Eastern Rumelia, which had its own large Turkish and Greek minorities, became an autonomous province under a Christian ruler, with its capital at Philippopolis. The remaining portions of the original "Greater Bulgaria" became the new state of Bulgaria.

In Russia, the Congress of Berlin was considered to be a dismal failure. After finally defeating the Turks despite many past inconclusive Russo-Turkish wars, many Russians had expected "something colossal", a redrawing of the Balkan borders in support of Russian territorial ambitions. Instead, the victory resulted in an Austro-Hungarian gain on the Balkan front that was brought about by the rest of the European powers' preference for a stronger Austria-Hungarian Empire, which threatened basically no one, to a powerful Russia, which had been locked in competition with Britain in the so-called Great Game for most of the century. Gorchakov said, "I consider the Berlin Treaty the darkest page in my life". Many Russians were furious over the European repudiation of their political gains, and though there was some thought that it represented only a minor stumble on the road to Russian hegemony in the Balkans, it actually gave Bosnia-Herzegovina and Serbia over to Austria-Hungary's sphere of influence and essentially removed all Russian influence from the area.

The Serbs were upset with "Russia... consenting to the cession of Bosnia to Austria":

Ristić who was Serbia's first plenipotentiary at Berlin tells how he asked Jomini, one of the Russian delegates, what consolation remained to the Serbs. Jomini replied that it would have to be the thought that 'the situation was only temporary because within fifteen years at the latest we shall be forced to fight Austria.' 'Vain consolation!' comments Ristić.

Italy was dissatisfied with the results of the Congress, and the tensions between Greece and the Ottoman Empire were left unresolved. Bosnia-Herzegovina would also prove to be problematic for the Austro-Hungarian Empire in later decades. The League of the Three Emperors, established in 1873, was destroyed since Russia saw lack of German support on the issue of Bulgaria's full independence as a breach of loyalty and the alliance. The border between Greece and Turkey was not resolved. In 1881, after protracted negotiations, a compromise border was accepted after a naval demonstration of the great powers had resulted in the cession of Thessaly and the Arta Prefecture to Greece.

Two states that didn't participate in the war, Great Britain and Austria-Hungary, achieved great benefits from this Congress. The former was granted administrative control of Cyprus in exchange for guarantees that Britain would use the island as a base to protect the Ottoman Empire against possible Russian aggression. The latter obtained the administration of Bosnia-Herzegovina and secured the control of a corridor leading to the Aegean Sea. Both of these territories had to remain de jure part of the Ottoman Empire, but in 1914 the British Empire formally annexed Cyprus, whereas Bosnia-Herzegovina was annexed by Austria in 1908.

Thus, the Berlin Congress sowed the seeds of further conflicts, including the Balkan Wars and (ultimately) the First World War. In the 'Salisbury Circular' of 1 April 1878, the British Foreign Secretary, the Marquess of Salisbury, clarified the objections of him and the government to the Treaty of San Stefano because of the favorable position in which it left Russia.

In 1954, the British historian A. J. P. Taylor wrote:

If the treaty of San Stefano had been maintained, both the Ottoman Empire and Austria-Hungary might have survived to the present day. The British, except for Beaconsfield in his wilder moments, had expected less and were therefore less disappointed. Salisbury wrote at the end of 1878: We shall set up a rickety sort of Turkish rule again south of the Balkans. But it is a mere respite. There is no vitality left in them.

Though the Congress of Berlin constituted a harsh blow to Pan-Slavism, it, by no means, solved the question of the area. The Slavs in the Balkans were still mostly under non-Slavic rule, split between the rule of Austria-Hungary and the ailing Ottoman Empire. The Slavic states of the Balkans had learned that banding together as Slavs benefited them less than playing to the desires of a neighboring great power. That damaged the unity of the Balkan Slavs and encouraged competition between the fledgling Slav states.

The underlying tensions of the region would continue to simmer for thirty years until they again exploded in the Balkan Wars of 1912–1913. In 1914, the assassination of Franz Ferdinand, the Austro-Hungarian heir, led to the First World War. In hindsight, the stated goal of maintaining peace and balance of powers in the Balkans obviously failed since the region would remain a source of conflict between the great powers well into the 20th century.

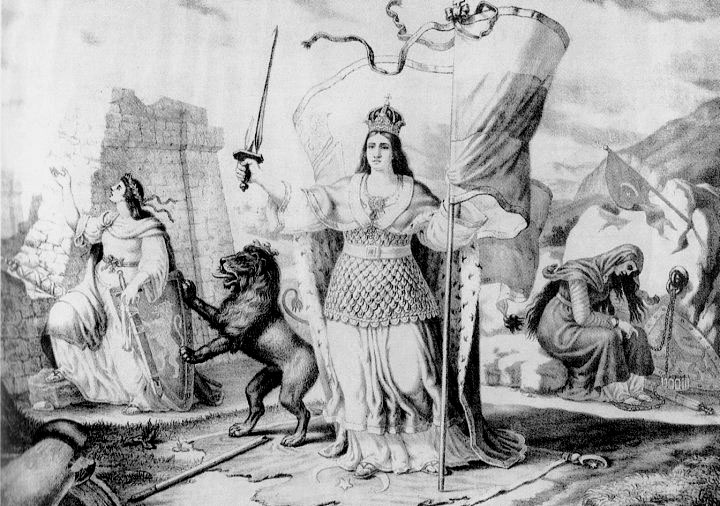
Allegorical depiction of Bulgarian autonomy after the Treaty of Berlin.
Lithograph by Nikolai Pavlovich

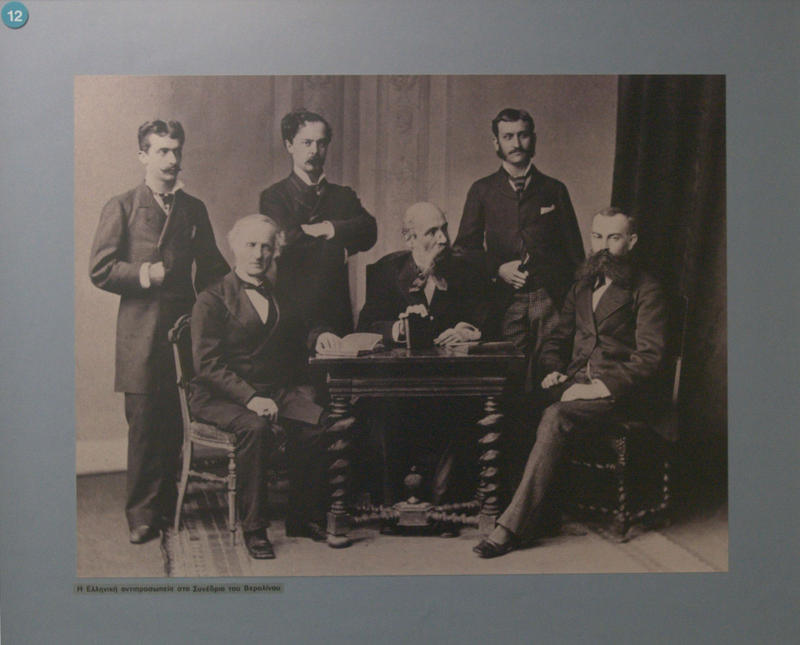
Greek Delegation in the Berlin Congress

== Internal opposition to Andrássy's objectives ==
Austro-Hungarian Foreign Minister Gyula Andrássy and the occupation and administration of Bosnia-Herzegovina also obtained the right to station garrisons in the Sanjak of Novi Pazar, which remained under Ottoman administration. The Sanjak preserved the separation of Serbia and Montenegro, and the Austro-Hungarian garrisons there would open the way for a dash to Salonika that "would bring the western half of the Balkans under permanent Austrian influence". "High [Austro-Hungarian] military authorities desired... [an] immediate major expedition with Salonika as its objective".

On 28 September 1878 the Finance Minister, Koloman von Zell, threatened to resign if the army, behind which stood the Archduke Albert, were allowed to advance to Salonika. In the session of the Hungarian Parliament of 5 November 1878 the Opposition proposed that the Foreign Minister should be impeached for violating the constitution by his policy during the Near East Crisis and by the occupation of Bosnia-Herzegovina. The motion was lost by 179 to 95. By the Opposition rank and file the gravest accusations were raised against Andrassy.

== Delegates ==
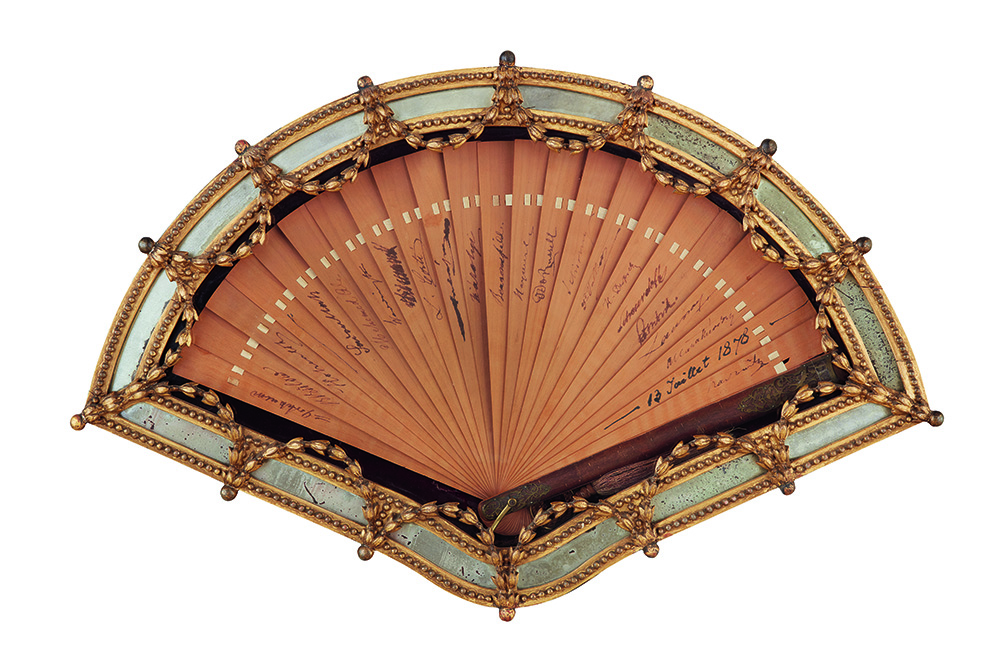
Fan signed by the delegates in the Berlin Congress

United Kingdom

- Benjamin Disraeli Earl of Beaconsfield (Prime Minister)
- Marquess of Salisbury (Foreign Secretary)
- Baron Ampthill (Ambassador to Germany)
- Richard B.P. Lyons (Ambassador to France)

Russia (Russian Empire)

- Prince Gorchakov (Foreign Minister)
- Count Shuvalov (Ambassador to Great Britain)
- Baron d'Oubril (Ambassador to Germany)

Germany (German Empire)

- Otto von Bismarck (Chancellor)
- Prince Hohenlohe (Ambassador to France)
- Bernhard Ernst von Bülow (State Secretary for Foreign Affairs)

Austria-Hungary

- Count Andrássy (Foreign Minister)
- Count Károlyi (Ambassador to Germany)
- Baron Heinrich Karl von Haymerle (Ambassador to Italy)

France

- Monsieur Waddington (Foreign Minister)
- Charles Raymond de Saint-Vallier
- Monsieur Desprey

Kingdom of Italy

- Count Corti (Foreign Minister)
- Count De Launay

Ottoman Empire

- Karatheodori Pasha
- Sadullah Pasha
- Mehmed Ali Pasha
- Catholicos Mkrtich Khrimian (representing Armenian population)

Romania

- Ion C. Brătianu
- Mihail Kogălniceanu

Greece (Kingdom of Greece)

- Theodoros Deligiannis

Serbia (Principality of Serbia)

- Jovan Ristić

Montenegro (Principality of Montenegro)

- Božo Petrović
- Stanko Radonjić

Albanians in the Congress (Albania)

- Abdyl Frasheri
- Jani Vreto

== See also ==
- International relations (1814–1919)
- Berlin Conference (1884)
- Armenian delegation at the Berlin Congress
- Eastern question

== References and further reading ==
- Albertini, Luigi (1952). The Origins of the War of 1914: European relations from the Congress of Berlin to the eve of the Sarajevo murder. Oxford University Press.
- Djordjevic, Dimitrije. "The Berlin Congress of 1878 and the Origins of World War I". Serbian Studies (1998) 12 #1 pp 1–10.
- Fabry, Mikulas (24–27 March 2002). The Idea of National Self-Determination and the Recognition of New States at the Congress of Berlin (1878). ISA Annual Convention. New Orleans. Archived from the original on 21 June 2008.
- Glenny, Misha (2000). The Balkans, 1804–1999: Nationalism, War and the Great Powers. Granta Books. ISBN 978-1-86207-073-8.
- Langer, William L. (1950). "5–6". European Alliances and Alignments 1871–1890.
- Medlicott, William Norton. Congress of Berlin and After (1963)
- Medlicott, W. N. (1929). "Diplomatic Relations after the Congress of Berlin". Slavonic and East European Review. 8 (22): 66–79. JSTOR 4202362.
- Millman, Richard. Britain and the Eastern Question, 1875–78 (1979)
- Phillips, Walter Alison (1911). "Berlin § Berlin, Congress and Treaty of" . In Chisholm, Hugh (ed.). Encyclopædia Britannica. Vol. 3 (11th ed.). Cambridge University Press. pp. 790–791.
- Seton-Watson, R.W. Disraeli, Gladstone, and the Eastern question: a study in diplomacy and party politics (1935) pp 431–89. online
- Sumner, B. H. (1937). Russia and the Balkans 1870-1880.
- Taylor, A. J. P. (1954). The Struggle for Mastery in Europe 1848–1918. Oxford: Oxford University Press. pp. 228–254. Wikidata Q141715908.
- Waller, Bruce (1974). Bismarck at the crossroads: the reorientation of German foreign policy after the Congress of Berlin, 1878–1880.
