= Constantinople Conference =

Multi-lateral diplomatic meeting regarding Bosnia (1876–77)

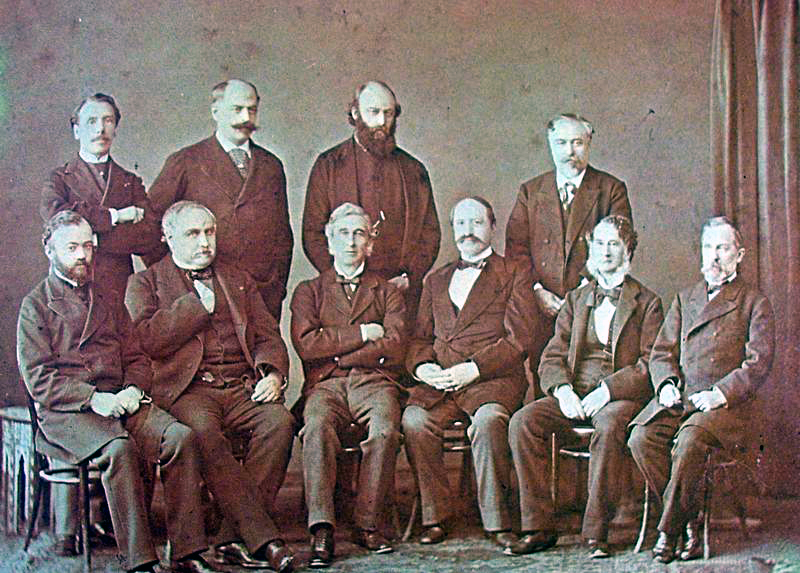
- Conference delegates
- Native name: Tersane Konferansı
- Date: 23 December 1876 – 20 January 1877
- Venue: Tersane Sarayı (Shipyard Palace)
- Location: Constantinople (now Istanbul)
- Type: Conference
- Theme: Bosnia and the Ottoman territories with a majority Bulgarian population
- Cause: The Herzegovinian Uprising in 1875 and the Bulgarian April Uprising in 1876
- Participants: Austria-Hungary; France; Germany; United Kingdom; Italy; Russia; United States; Ottoman Empire
- Outcome: Agreed on a project for political reforms

The 1876–77 Constantinople Conference (Turkish: Tersane Konferansı "Shipyard Conference", after the venue Tersane Sarayı "Shipyard Palace") of the Great Powers (Austria-Hungary, Britain, France, Germany, Italy and Russia) was held in Constantinople (now Istanbul) from 23 December 1876 until 20 January 1877. Following the beginning of the Herzegovinian Uprising in 1875 and the April Uprising in April 1876, the Great Powers agreed on a project for political reforms in Bosnia and in the Ottoman territories with a majority-Bulgarian population. The Ottoman Empire refused the proposed reforms, leading to the Russo-Turkish War a few months later.

== Participants ==
The Great Powers were represented at the conference respectively by:

- United Kingdom of Great Britain and Ireland:

Lord Salisbury and Sir Henry Elliot;

- Russian Empire:

Count Nikolay Ignatyev (historical spelling Nicolai Ignatieff);

- French Republic:

Count Jean-Baptiste de Chaudordy and Count François de Bourgoing;

- German Empire:

Baron Karl von Werther;

- Austro-Hungarian Empire:

Baron Heinrich von Calice and Count Ferenc Zichy;

- Kingdom of Italy:

Count Luigi (Lodovico) Corti.

Of these, Lord Salisbury, Count de Chaudordy and Baron von Calice were Ambassadors Plenipotentiary to the conference, while Count Ignatyev, Sir Henry Elliot, Count de Bourgoing, Baron von Werther, Count Zichy and Count Corti were the resident Ambassadors of their countries in Constantinople.

The US Consul General in Constantinople, Eugene Schuyler also took an active part in drafting the conference decisions.

The Ottoman Empire was represented at the conference by:

- Midhat Pasha, Saffet Pasha and Edhem Pasha.

Midhat Pasha was the Grand Vizier (First Minister), and Saffet Pasha the Foreign Minister of the Ottoman Empire. Although the Ottoman representatives participated in the plenaries of the conference, they were not invited to the preceding working sessions at which the Great Powers negotiated and elaborated their agreement.

Lord Salisbury and Count Ignatyev played a leading role in the process. Ignatyev was trying to dispel British misgivings about Russia's assumed role of a protector of the Eastern Orthodox Slavs being but a disguise of its drive to take over the Black Sea Straits and Constantinople itself and thus – as Prime Minister Disraeli feared – potentially threaten the vital Mediterranean routes to British India via the Suez Canal, completed in 1869. On his part, Salisbury saw the conference as a promising opportunity for mapping out a comprehensive deal with Russia over their conflicting territorial ambitions in Central Asia.

== Gallery ==
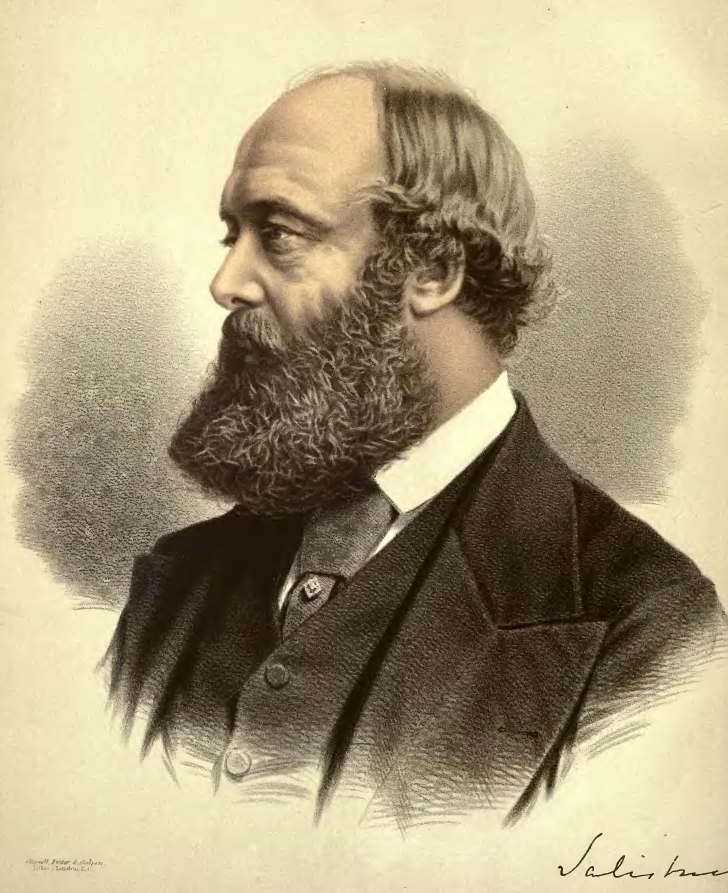
Lord Salisbury

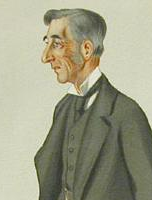
Sir Henry Elliot

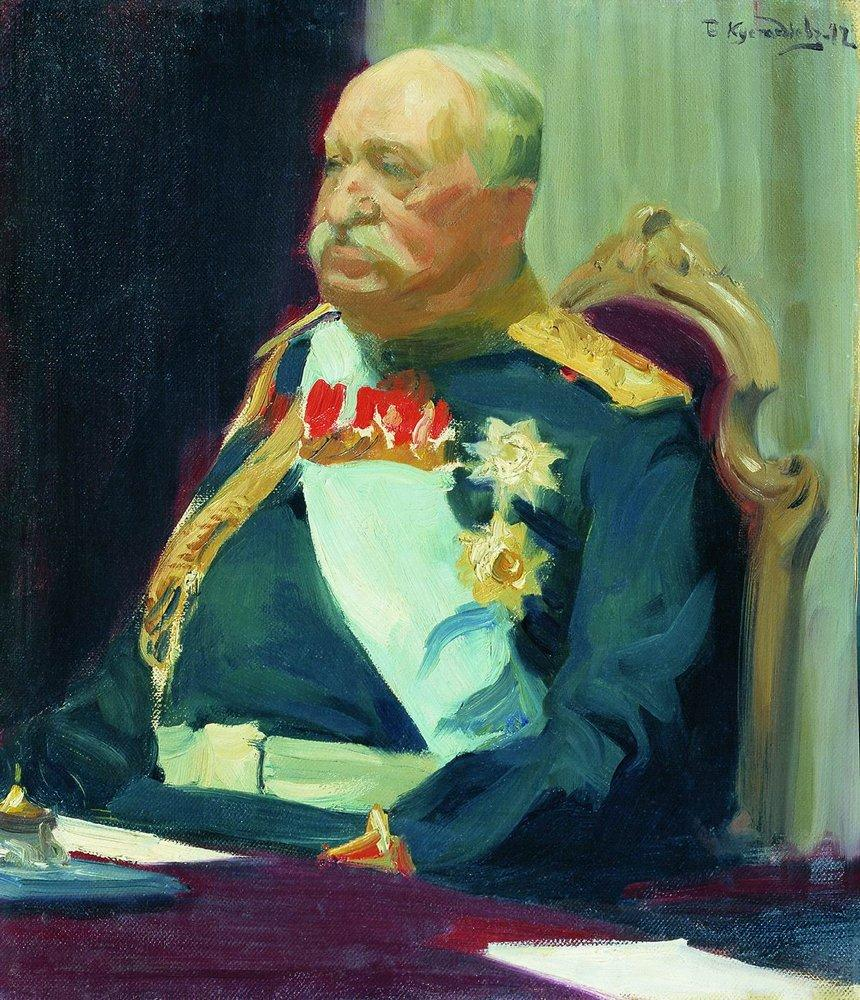
Count Ignatieff

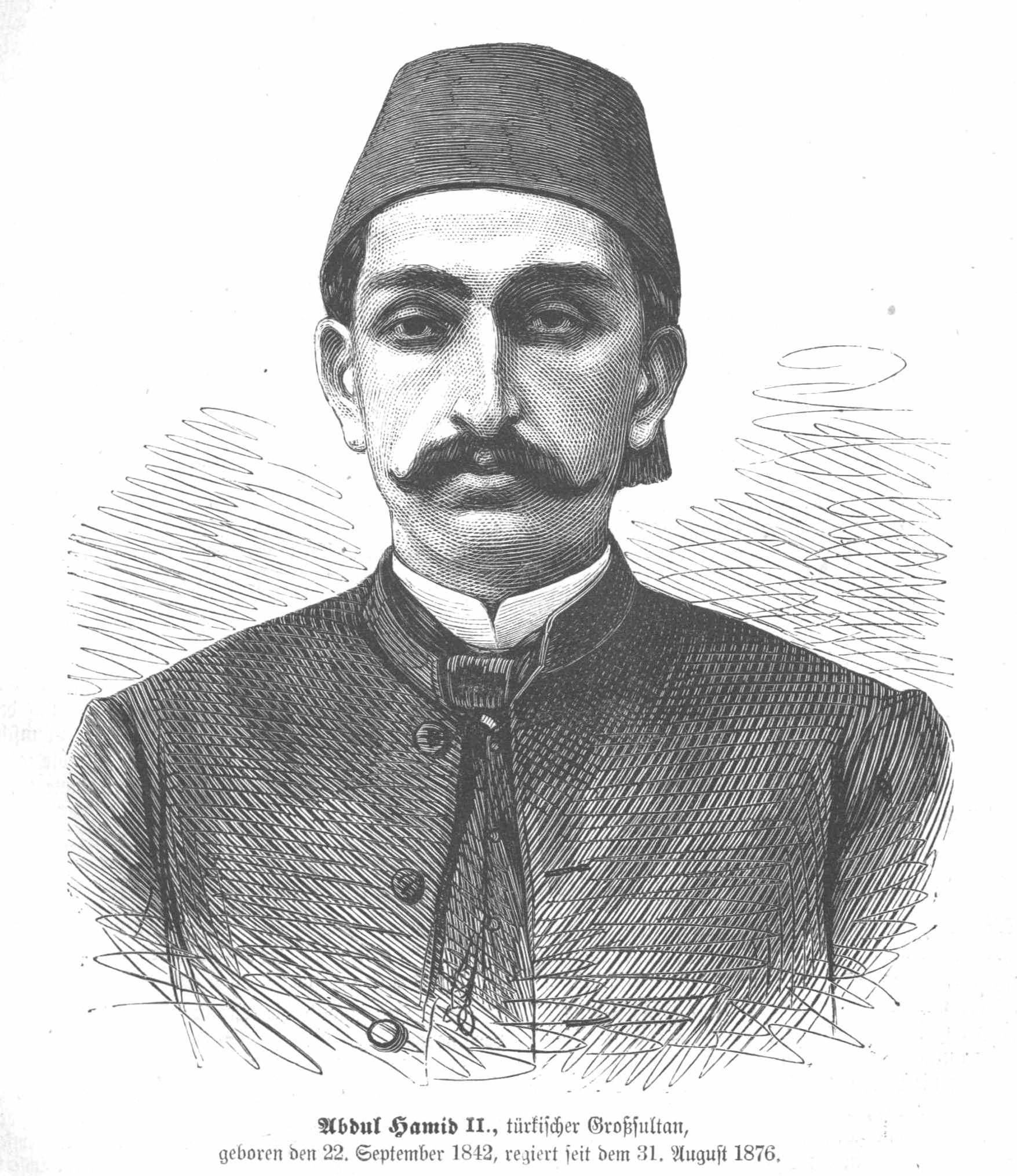
Sultan Abdul Hamid II

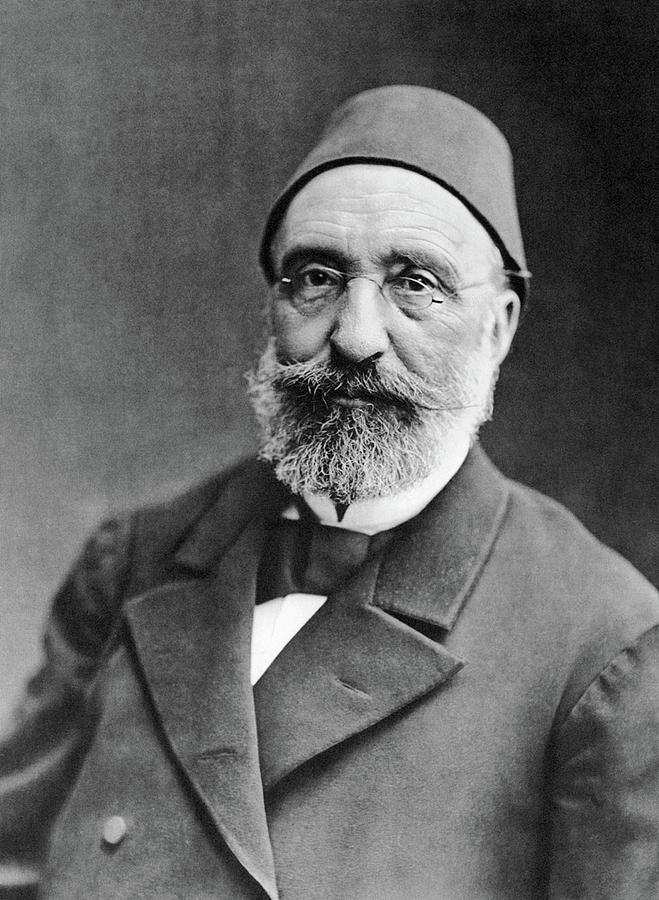
Midhat Pasha

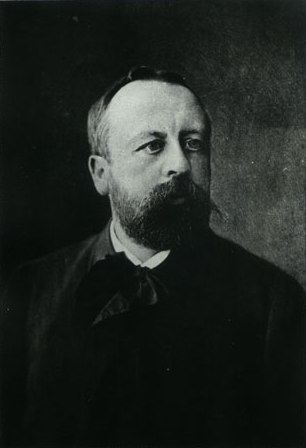
Eugene Schuyler

== Decisions ==
=== Bosnia ===
The conference envisaged the creation of an autonomous province including Bosnia and most of Herzegovina, while a southern part of the latter was to be ceded to the Principality of Montenegro.

=== Bulgaria ===
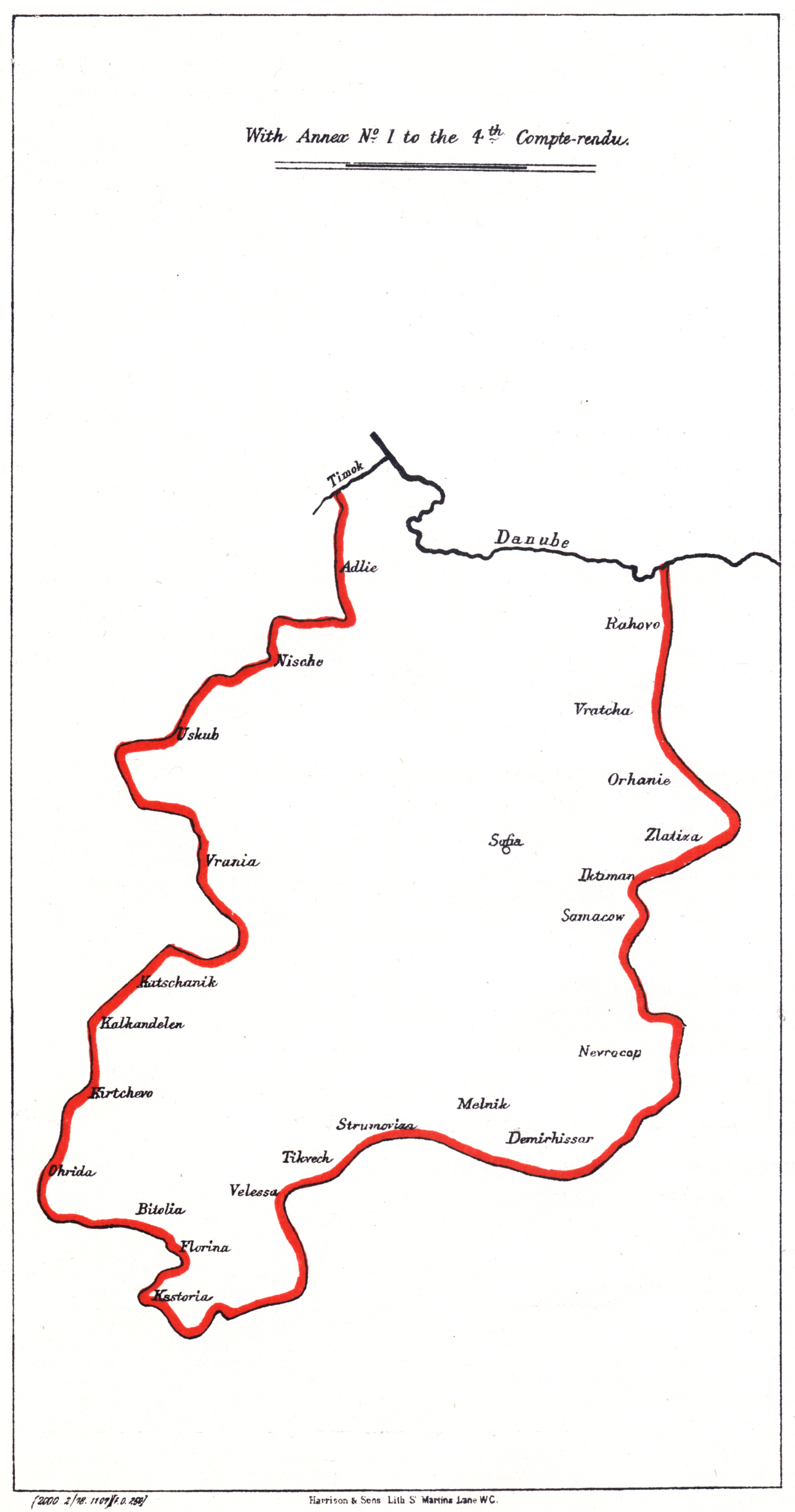
Western Bulgarian autonomous province

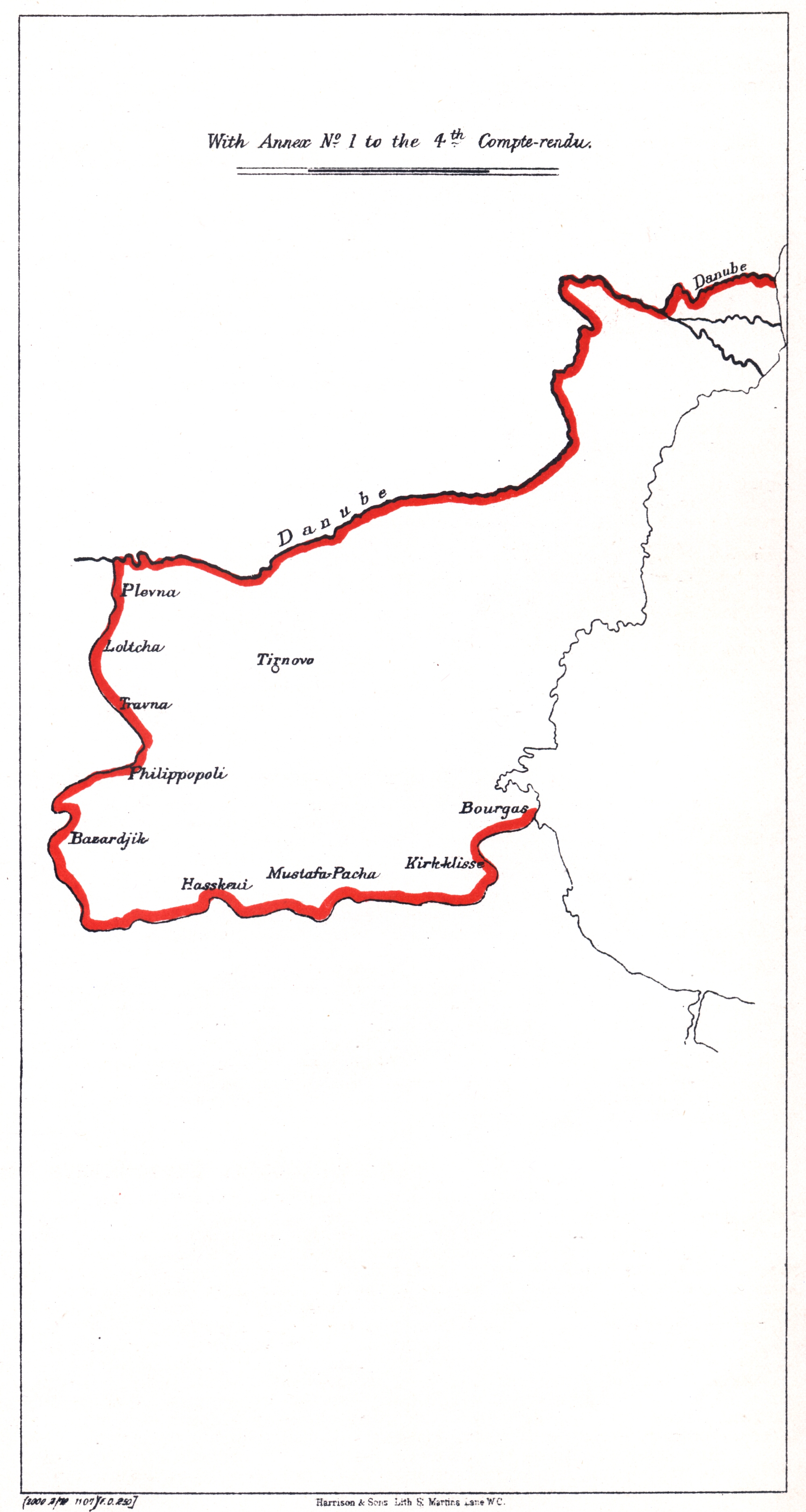
Eastern Bulgarian autonomous province

The Great Powers agreed on a substantial Bulgarian autonomy to take the form of two new Ottoman provinces (vilayets) established for the purpose: Eastern, with capital Tarnovo, and Western, with capital Sofia.

The conference determined that, as of the late 19th century, the Bulgarian ethnic territories within the Ottoman Empire extended to Tulcea and the Danube Delta in the northeast, Ohrid and Kastoria in the southwest, Kirklareli and Edirne in the southeast, and Leskovac and Niš in the northwest. These territories were to be incorporated into the two Bulgarian autonomous provinces as follows:

- Eastern Bulgarian autonomous province, including the Ottoman sandjaks – second level administrative divisions – of Tırnova, Rusçuk, Tulça, Varna, Sliven, Filibe (bar the kazas – third level administrative divisions – of Sultaneri and Ahıçelebi), and part of the Edirne sandjak including the kazas of Kırkkilise, Mustafapaşa and Kızılağaç.
- Western Bulgarian autonomous province, including the sandjaks of Sofya, Vidin, Niş, Üsküp, Manastır (bar the kazas of Debre and Korça), the Nevrokop, Melnik and Demirhisar kazas of the Serez sandjak, and the kazas of Ustrumca, Köprülü, Tikveş and Kesriye.

The Great Powers elaborated in detail the constitutional, legislative, executive, defense and law enforcement arrangements, cantonal administrative system, taxation, international supervision etc. for the proposed autonomous provinces.

== Conclusion ==
The agreed decisions of the six Great Powers were formally handed over to the Ottoman Government on 23 December 1876, dismissing the opening Ottoman suggestions that the Conference's mission might be unnecessary, given a new Ottoman Constitution approved by Sultan Abdul Hamid II that same day. In the subsequent conference's plenary sessions, the Ottoman Empire submitted objections and alternative reform proposals that were rejected by the Great Powers, and attempts to bridge the gap did not succeed. Eventually, on 18 January 1877 Grand Vizier Midhat Pasha announced the definitive refusal of the Ottoman Empire to accept the conference decisions.

== Legacy ==
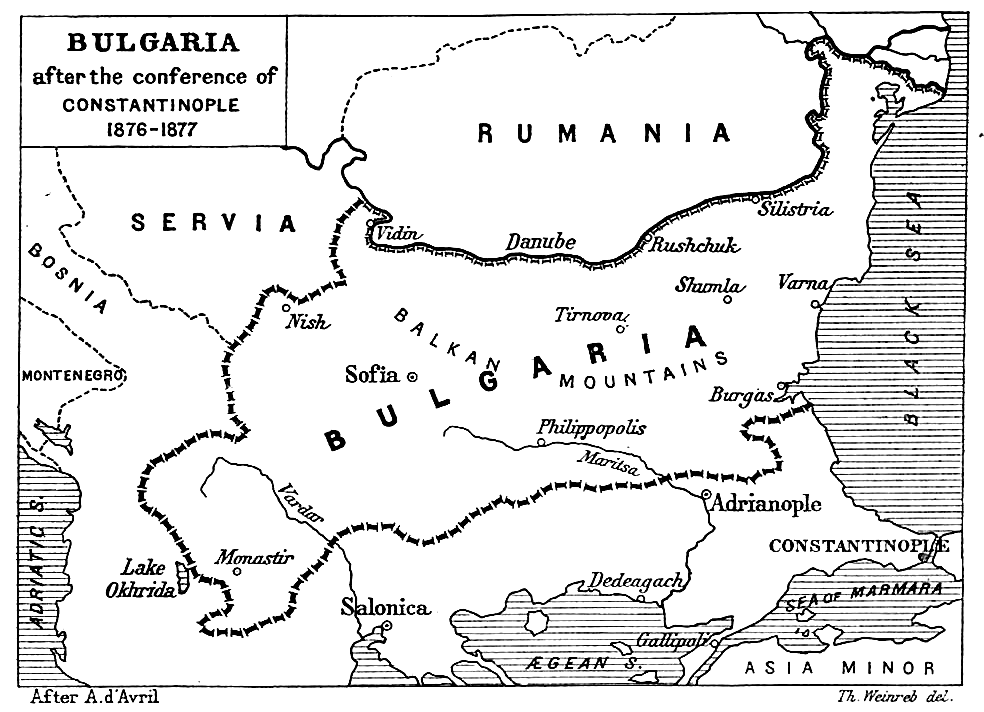
Bulgaria according to the Constantinople Conference

The rejection by the Ottoman Government of the decisions of the Constantinople Conference triggered the 1877–1878 Russo-Turkish War, depriving at the same time the Ottoman Empire – in contrast to the preceding 1853–1856 Crimean War – of Western support.

Tsarigrad Peak in Imeon Range on Smith Island in the South Shetland Islands, Antarctica is named after the conference (‘Tsarigrad’ being the old Bulgarian name for Constantinople).

Bulgarian historiography treats the conference as the most reliable international evidence for the Bulgarian character of the local Slavic population of Macedonia due to the fact that the Ottoman Empire and the 6 European Great Powers, regardless of the differences in their geopolitical interests, recognized the majority of the area as such with a predominantly Bulgarian population, although the April Uprising, which drew international attention to the Bulgarian national question, hardly broke out in Macedonia.

== Maps ==
- Bulgaria in the borders after the Treaties of Constantinople, San-Stephano, Berlin, London, Bucharest and Neuilly. Scale 1:1600000 map. (in German)

== See also ==
- April Uprising of 1876
- Congress of Berlin
- Eastern question
- Great Eastern Crisis
- Herzegovina uprising (1875–1877)
- International relations (1814–1919)
- Russo-Turkish War (1877–1878)
