= Bajo Nunatak =

Rocky peak in the South Shetland Islands, Antarctica

Location of Robert Island in the South Shetland Islands.

Bajo Nunatak is a conspicuous rocky peak rising to 210 m at the south edge of the ice cap of Robert Island in the South Shetland Islands, Antarctica. The nunatak surmounts Zahari Point to the southeast, Micalvi Cove to the east-southeast, and English Strait to the southwest.

The feature was charted and descriptively named by the Chilean Antarctic Expeditions in 1948–50.

== Location ==
The nunatak is located at 62°26′52.3″S 59°32′25″W which is 1.9 km east by south of Beron Point, 2.69 km northwest of Edwards Point, 5.88 km north of Santa Cruz Point, Greenwich Island and 6.34 km northeast of Ash Point, Greenwich Island (Bulgarian mapping in 2005 and 2009).

== See also ==
- Robert Island
- South Shetland Islands

== Maps ==
- L.L. Ivanov et al. Antarctica: Livingston Island and Greenwich Island, South Shetland Islands. Scale 1:100000 topographic map. Sofia: Antarctic Place-names Commission of Bulgaria, 2005.
- L.L. Ivanov. Antarctica: Livingston Island and Greenwich, Robert, Snow and Smith Islands. Scale 1:120000 topographic map. Troyan: Manfred Wörner Foundation, 2009. ISBN 978-954-92032-6-4
