= Chardafon =

Bulgarian revolutionary

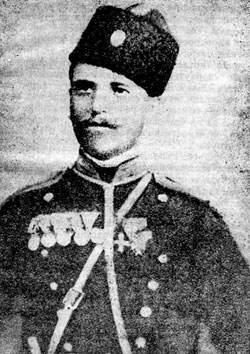
Chardafon

Chardafon (Bulgarian: Чардафон), born Prodan Tishkov (Продан Тишков; 1860 in Gabrovo – 22 November 1906), was a Bulgarian revolutionary. Chardafon took part in the Russo-Turkish War of 1877–78 as a volunteer. After the liberation, he became sergeant-major of East Rumelia's militia in Golyamo Konare, now known as Saedinenie.

Until 1884, his nickname was Charda, which stands for "flock of cattle". Since a mockery in his militia work, general Von Drigalsky added "fon" (a German preposition denoting aristocratic origin) so his famous nickname appeared — Chardafon. He took part in the preparation and proclamation of the Unification of Bulgaria. He was a member of the Bulgarian Secret Central Revolutionary Committee in Golyamo Konare and led a detachment, which entered Plovdiv on 6 September 1885 and took part in the city governor's arrest.

After the Unification of Bulgaria, he became a major at the cavalry. Zahari Stoyanov wrote a humorous outline for him, entitled Chardafon the Great.

== See also ==
- Unification of Bulgaria
- FC Chardafon Gabrovo
- City of Gabrovo
