= Dimitar Rizov =

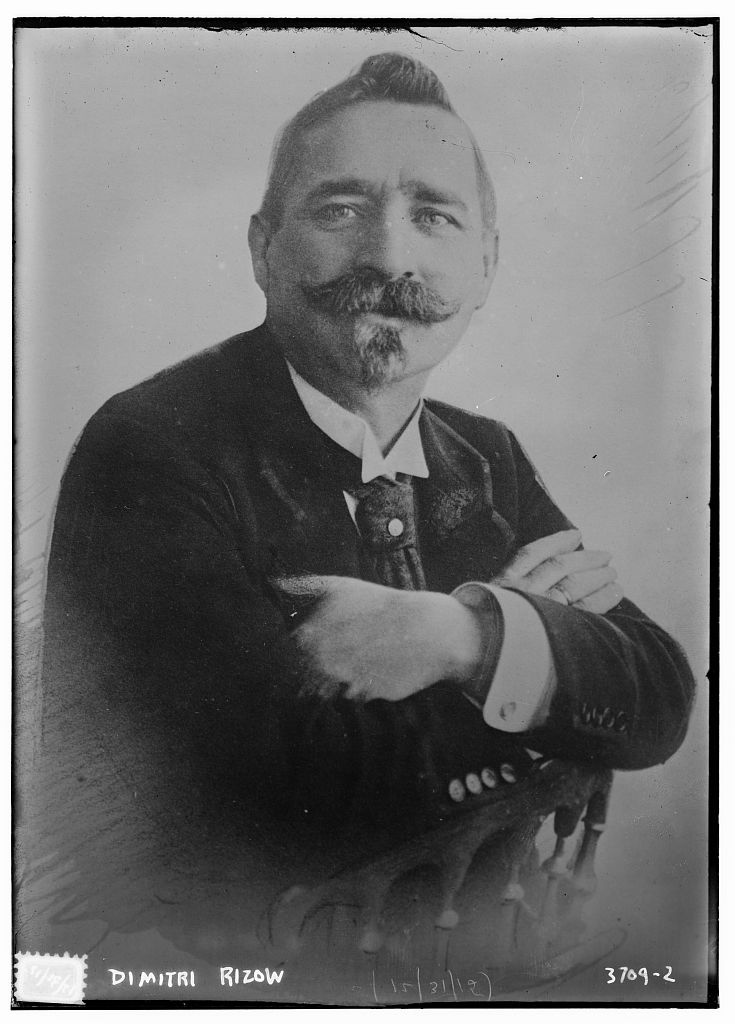
- Born: 1860; Manastır, Sanjak of Monastir, Rumelia Eyalet, Ottoman Empire (today Bitola, North Macedonia)
- Died: April 23, 1918 (aged 57–58); Berlin, Germany
- Other name: Dimitar Rizoff
- Occupation: Deputy in the Bulgarian Parliament from the Liberal Party
- Known for: Bulgarian revolutionary and diplomat

Dimitar Hristov Rizov or Rizoff (Bulgarian: Димитър Христов Ризов, Macedonian: Димитар Христов Ризов; 1862 – 1918) was a Bulgarian revolutionary, publicist, politician, journalist and diplomat.

== Life ==
Rizov was born in 1860 in Manastır, Ottoman Empire (today Bitola, North Macedonia). At first he studied in his native town and then he continued study in Plovdiv (Filibe). In 1881 he opened a book store in Manastır, and a year later he was an Exarchist's school inspector of the Bulgarian schools in Macedonia.

In 1884 he began to participate in the Bulgarian politics; became an editor of the Liberal Party newspaper Tarnovo Constitution. Rizov was a part of the immigrant wave in the Eastern Rumelian capital Plovdiv, where he actively participated in the Bulgarian Secret Central Revolutionary Committee and in the preparations for the Bulgarian unification. He was a member of the temporary revolutionary government in Plovdiv on September 6–9, 1885. Rizov was an MP in the Third Great National Assembly (Parliament)(1886–87). In 1887 he continued his education in University of Liège in Belgium with an Evlogi Georgiev stipend.

Rizov was an editor of the newspapers Hristo Botev, and co-editor (with Andrey Lyapchev) of Young Bulgaria (1895–1896). He co-edited Self-defense (1885), Macedonian Voice (1885–1887), Independence (1886), and other newspapers. He is an author of the first Ethnography of Macedonia (1881, in French) and of a number of pamphlets on Bulgarian foreign policies. In 1895, Dimitar Rizov was elected a member of Supreme Macedonian-Adrianople Committee at the organization's Second Regular Congress.

Since 1897 Dimitar Rizov worked as a diplomat. He was a Bulgarian ambassador in Üsküp, now Skopje (1897–1899), diplomatic agent in Cetinje (1903–1905), Belgrade (1905–1907), plenipotentiary minister in Rome (1908–1915), and Berlin (1915–1918). In 1917 in Berlin, together with his brother, Nikola Rizov (also diplomat and publicist), he published the Atlas Bulgarians in their historical, ethnographic, and political frontiers, Berlin 1917, containing 40 maps and explanatory texts in German, English, French, and Bulgarian. Of special significance are the maps, drawn by the leading Bulgarian scientists Prof. Anastas Ishirkov (geography) and Prof. Vasil Zlatarski (history). The atlas contains facsimiles of maps by Pavel Jozef Šafárik, Ami Boué, Ljubomir Davidović, Lejean, F. Hahn and Zach, Mackensie and Irby, Prof. Erben, Elisée Reclus, Kiepert, Synvet, Vasil Kantschoff, and others.

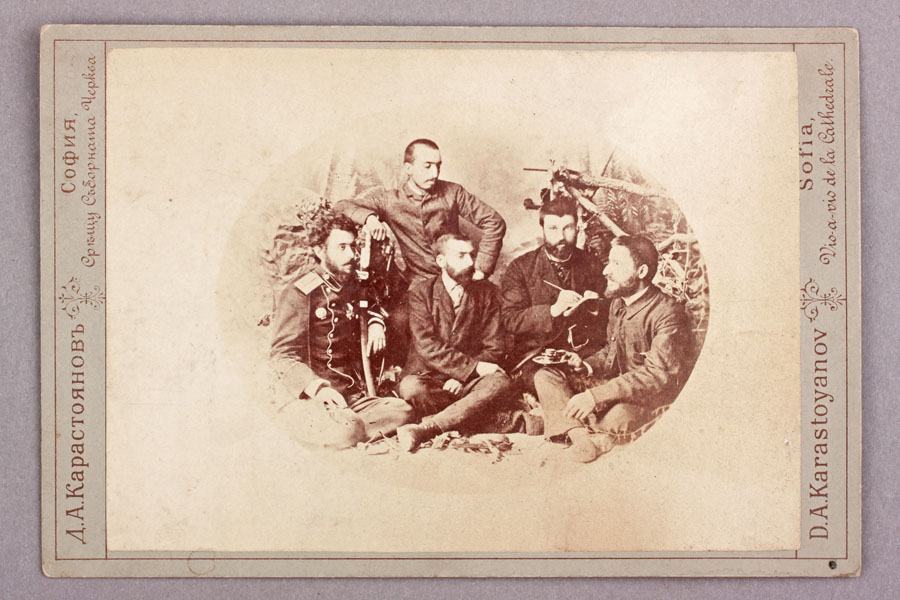
The leaders of the Bulgarian Secret Central Revolutionary Committee: Kosta Panitsa, Ivan Stoyanovich, Zahari Stoyanov, Ivan Andonov, and Dimitar Rizov

Rizov often changed his political positions for which he was known with the nickname "The Man of the Hundred Opinions". For his opposition to Kniaz Ferdinand, Rizov was sent to prison; later, however, Rizov accepted the Kniaz's regime and political aims. With respect to the Bulgarian national question, and, in particular, to the Macedonian Question, Rizov is unwavering in defending the rights of Bulgarians living outside of the Bulgarian borders.
