= Treaty of Bucharest =

Treaty of Bucharest may refer to the following treaties signed in Bucharest:

- Treaty of Bucharest (1812), between the Ottoman Empire and the Russian Empire ending the 1806–1812 Russo-Turkish war
- Treaty of Bucharest (1886), between Serbia and Bulgaria ending the Serbo-Bulgarian War
- Treaty of Bucharest (1913), between Bulgaria, Romania, Serbia, Montenegro and Greece ending of the Second Balkan War
- Treaty of Bucharest (1916), a treaty of alliance between Romania and the Entente powers (France, Britain, Italy, and Russia)
- Treaty of Bucharest (1918), between Romania and the Central Powers (Austria-Hungary, Bulgaria, Germany and the Ottoman Empire), subsequently nullified due to the defeat of the Central Powers
