= Devesil Bight =

Embayment in Robert Island, South Shetland Island, Antarctica

Location of Robert Island in the South Shetland Islands.

Topographic map of Livingston Island, Greenwich, Robert, Snow and Smith Islands.

Devesil Bight (Bulgarian: Залив Девесил, romanized: zaliv Devesil, IPA: [ˈzaliv dɛvɛˈsiɫ]) is the 5.8 km wide embayment indenting for 2.2 km the southeast coast of Robert Island in the South Shetland Islands, Antarctica between Kermen Peninsula and the 2.7 km peninsula ending up in Robert Point. Entered between Edwards Point and Robert Point. Shape enhanced as a result of glacier retreat in the late 20th and early 21st century.

The feature is named after the settlement of Devesilovo in southern Bulgaria.

== Location ==
Devesil Bight is centred at 62°27′00″S 59°26′30″W. Bulgarian mapping in 2009.

== Map ==
- L.L. Ivanov. Antarctica: Livingston Island and Greenwich, Robert, Snow and Smith Islands. Scale 1:120000 topographic map. Troyan: Manfred Wörner Foundation, 2009. ISBN 978-954-92032-6-4
