= Macedonian Voice (company) =

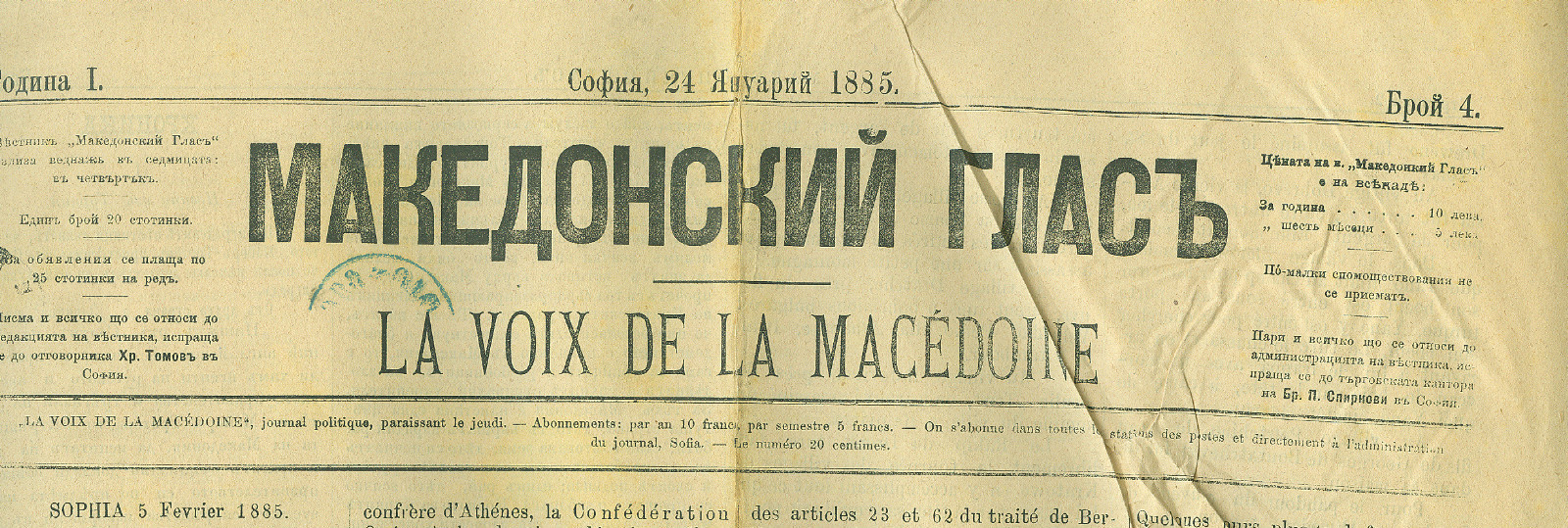
Newspaper Makedonski Glas 1885

Macedonian Voice (Bulgarian:Македонский глас) was a Bulgarian society that existed between the end of 1884 and September 1885, working to improve the situation of the Bulgarian population under Ottoman rule of Macedonia.

== History ==
On July 1, 1885 at the Congress in Sofia, nineteen Macedonian companies chose the Central Board of Macedonian Voice with Dimitar Rizov and Dimitar Petkov. At the head of the company was Vasil Diamandiev. Prominent figures were Dimitar Rizov (later chairman), Yosif Kovachev, Ilia Georgov, Dimitar Petkov.

From January 5, 1885, the company began publishing the Macedonian Voice newspaper, the same name, published once a week.
