= Bulgarian Secret Central Revolutionary Committee =

Bulgarian revolutionary organization

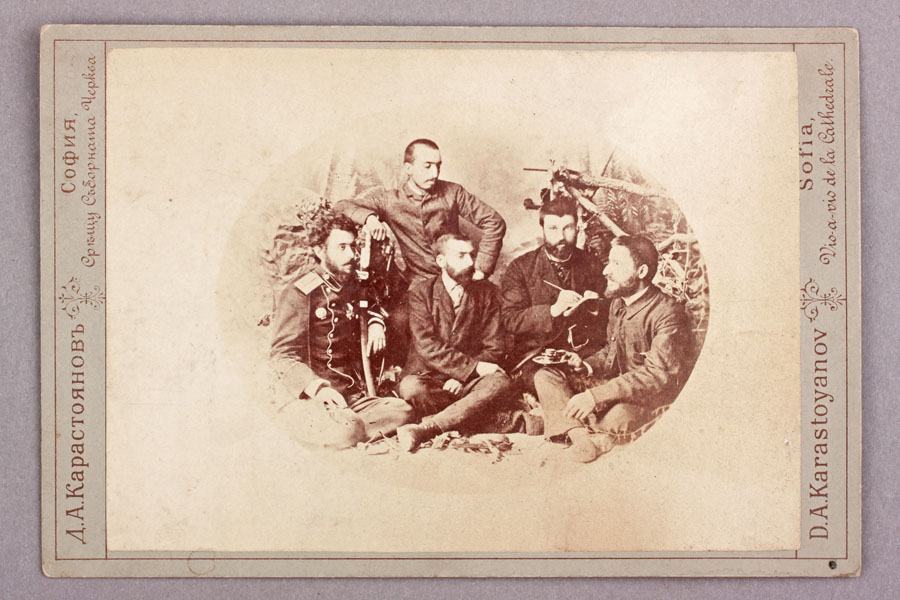
Bulgarian Secret Central Revolutionary Committee: Kosta Panitsa, Ivan Stoyanovich , Zahari Stoyanov, Ivan Andonov, and Dimitar Rizov.

Bulgarian Secret Central Revolutionary Committee (BSCRC) was a Bulgarian revolutionary organization founded in Plovdiv, then in Eastern Rumelia on February 10, 1885. The original purpose of the committee was to gain autonomy for the region of Macedonia (Western Rumelia), but in perspective, the formation of a Balkan federation. According to Ivan Andonov, the committee was established to resolve the Macedonian Question by the initiative of the revolutionary Spiro Kostov, who inspired both, Andonov and Zahari Stoyanov toward revolutionary activity for the liberation of the Macedonian Bulgarians. However, BSCRC played an important role in the organization of the Unification of Bulgaria and Eastern Rumelia.

== See also ==
- Secret society
