= Bulgarian unification =

1885 unification of the Principality of Bulgaria and Eastern Rumelia

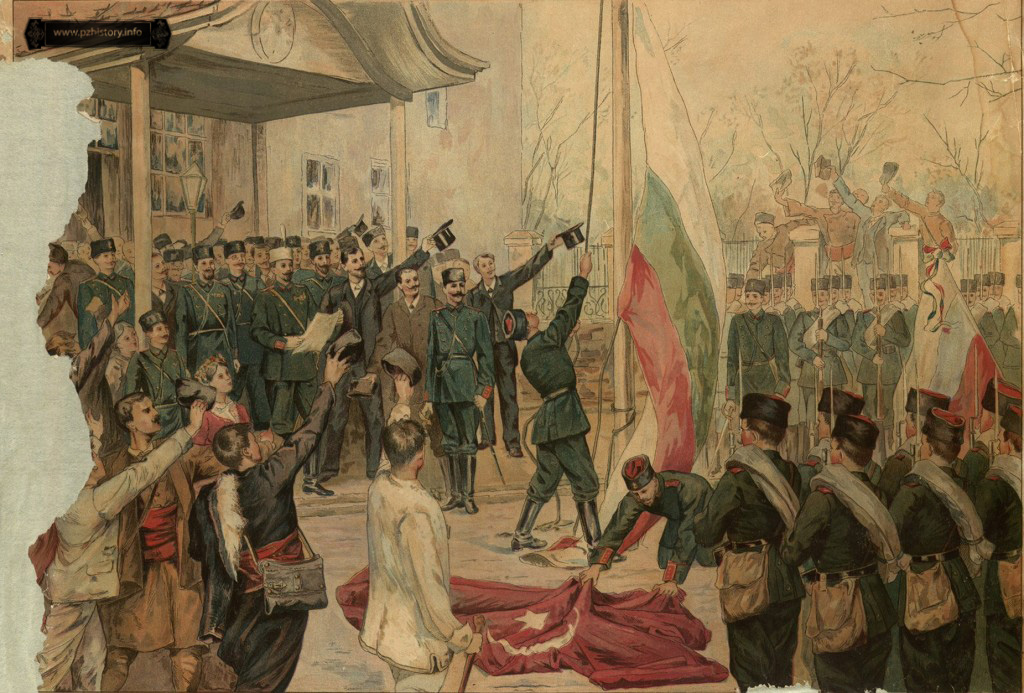
- Declaration of the Unification - lithograph by Franz Jaschke (1862-1910)
- Native name: Съединение
- Date: 18 September [O.S. 6 September] 1885
- Location: Bulgaria
- Participants: Principality of Bulgaria: Bulgarian Secret Central Revolutionary Committee
- Outcome: Unification between Eastern Rumelia and Bulgaria; Beginning of the Serbo-Bulgarian war; Beginning of the Bulgarian Crisis

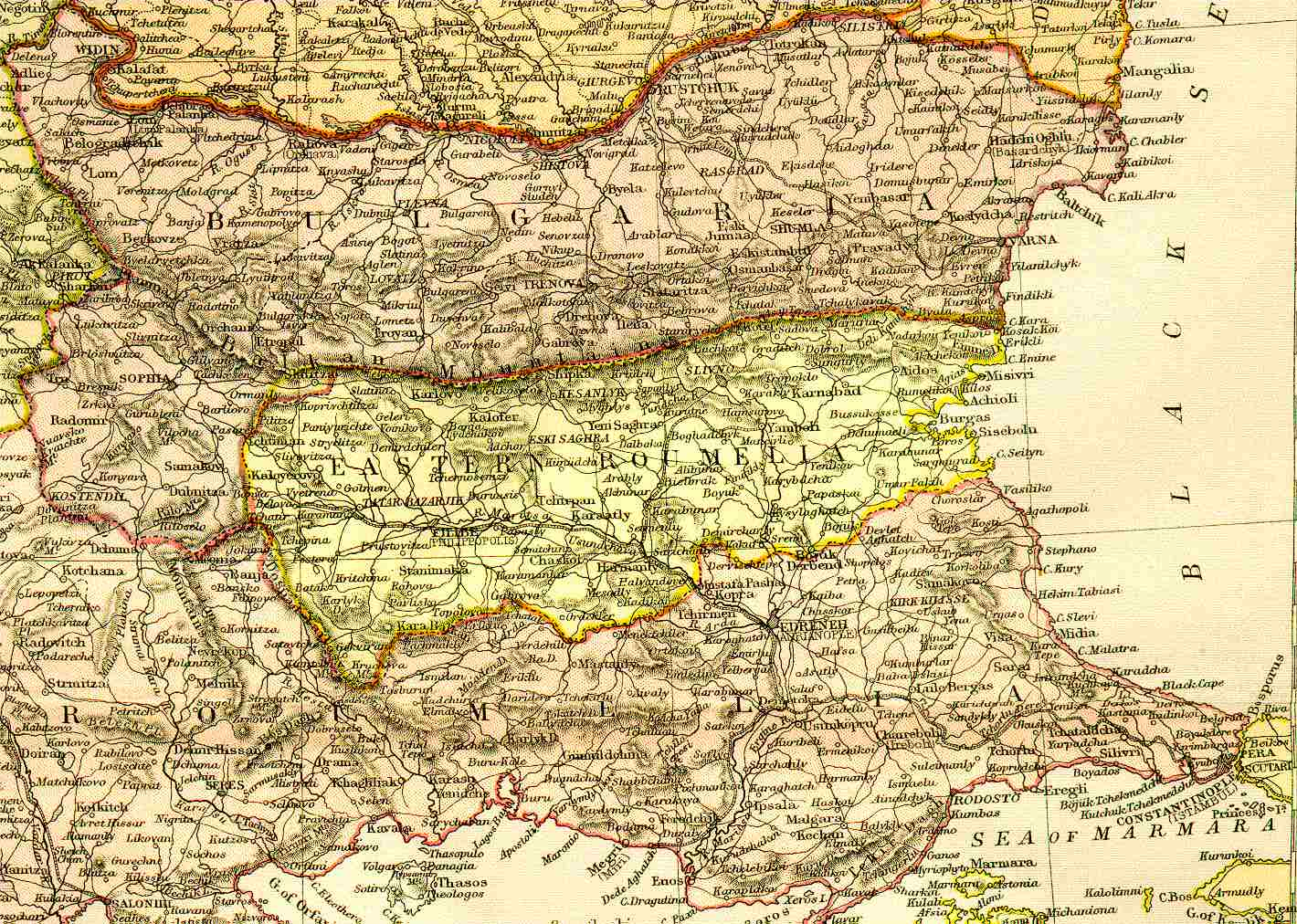
A map of the Principality of Bulgaria and Eastern Rumelia before the Unification.

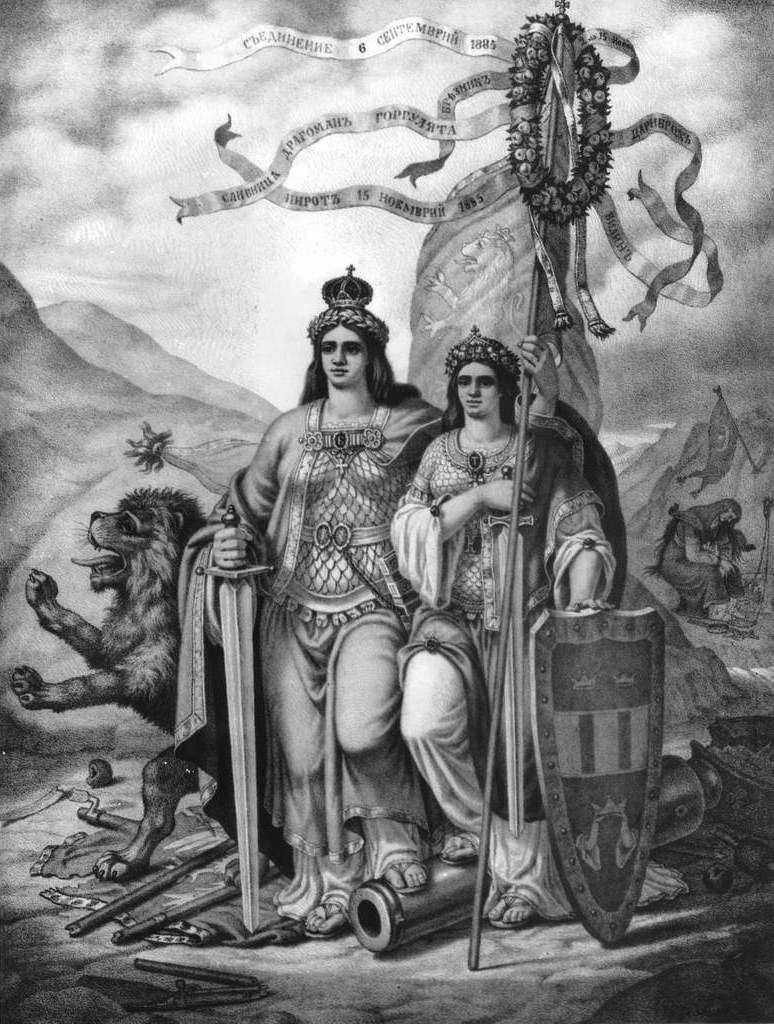
United Bulgaria – a lithograph by Nikolai Pavlovich (1835–1894)

The Unification of Bulgaria (Bulgarian: Съединение на България, romanized: Suedinenie na Bulgariya) was the act of unification of the Principality of Bulgaria and the province of Eastern Rumelia in the autumn of 1885. It was co-ordinated by the Bulgarian Secret Central Revolutionary Committee (BSCRC). Both had been parts of the Ottoman Empire, but the principality had functioned de facto independently whilst the Rumelian province was autonomous and had an Ottoman presence. The unification was accomplished after revolts in Eastern Rumelian towns, followed by a coup on 18 September [O.S. 6 September] 1885 supported by the Bulgarian Prince Alexander I. The BSCRC, formed by Zahari Stoyanov, began actively popularizing the idea of unification by means of the press and public demonstrations in the spring of 1885.

== Background ==
The 10th Russo-Turkish War ended with the signing of the preliminary Treaty of San Stefano, which cut large territories from the Ottoman Empire. Bulgaria was resurrected after 482 years of foreign rule, albeit as a principality under Ottoman suzerainty.

The Russian diplomats knew that Bulgaria would not remain within these borders for very long – the San Stefano peace was called "preliminary" by the Russians themselves. The Congress of Berlin began on 13 June [O.S. 1 June] 1878 and ended on 13 July [O.S. 1 July] 1878 with the Berlin Treaty that created a vassal Bulgarian state in the lands between the Balkans and the Danube. The area between the Balkan Mountains and the Rila and Rhodope Mountains became an autonomous Ottoman province called Eastern Rumelia. The separation of southern Bulgaria into a different administrative region was a guarantee against the fears expressed by Great Britain and Austria-Hungary that Bulgaria would gain access to the Aegean Sea, which logically meant that Russia was getting closer to the Mediterranean.

The third large portion of Treaty-of-Berlin Bulgaria, Macedonia, remained within the Ottoman borders as it had been before the war.

== Organization ==
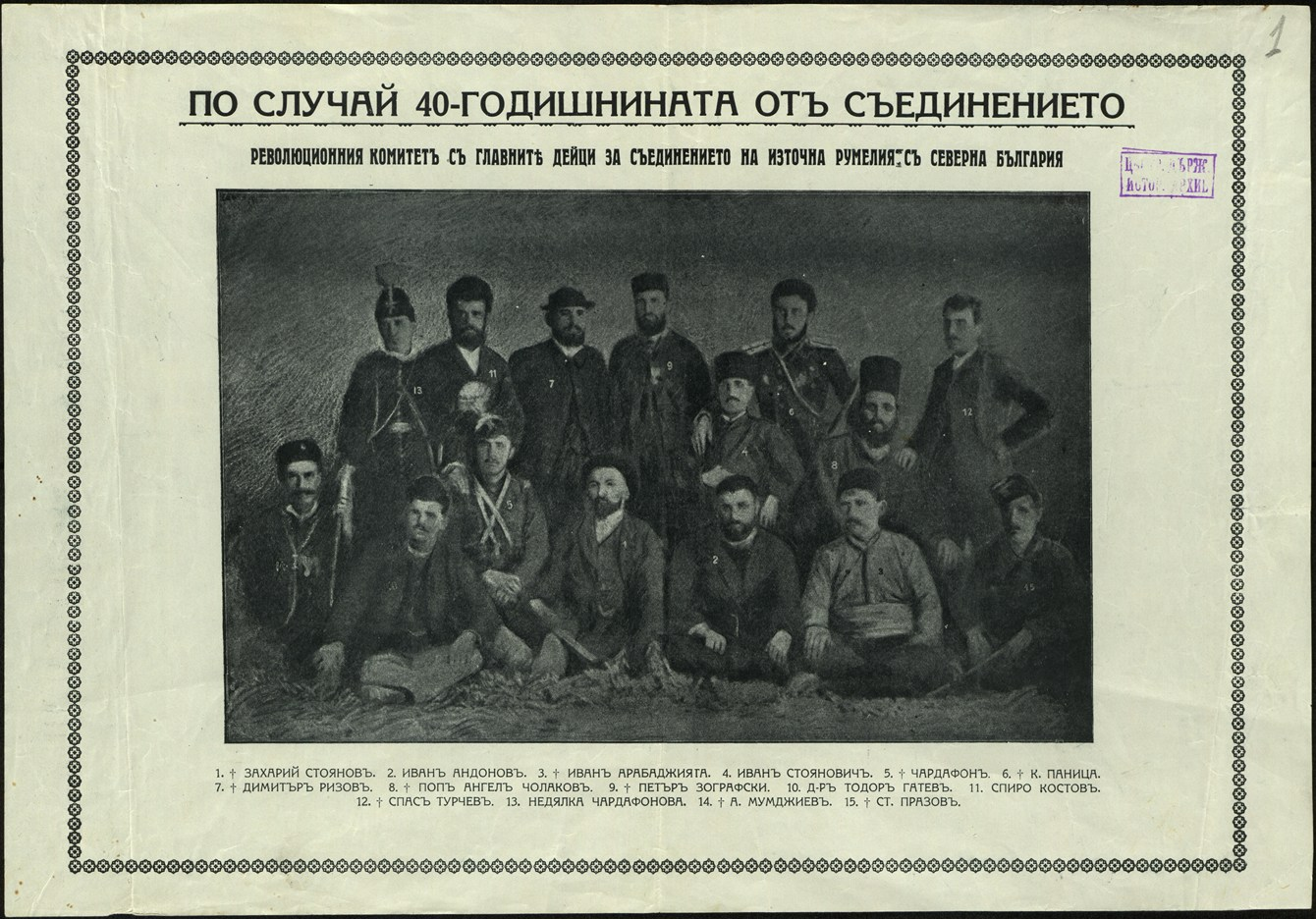
Bulgarian Secret Central Revolutionary Committee

In these conditions it was natural that Bulgarians in Bulgaria, Eastern Rumelia and Macedonia all strived for unity. The first attempt was made in 1880. The new British prime minister, William Ewart Gladstone (who had strongly supported the Bulgarian cause in the past) made Bulgarian politicians hope that the British policy on the Eastern Question was about to change, and that it will support and look favourably upon an eventual union. Unfortunately, the Second Gladstone ministry did not bring a change in Great Britain's interests. Secondly, there was a possible conflict growing between the Ottoman Empire on one side and Greece and Montenegro on the other.

The union activists from Eastern Rumelia sent Stefan Panaretov, a lecturer in Robert College, to consult the British opinion on the planned unification. Gladstone's government though, did not accept these plans. Disagreement came from Imperial Russia as well, which was strictly following the decisions taken during the Berlin Congress. Meanwhile, the tensions between Greece and the Ottoman Empire had settled, which finally brought the first unification attempt to a failure.

By mid-1885 most of the active unionists in Eastern Rumelia shared the vision that the preparation of a revolution in Macedonia should be postponed and all efforts should be concentrated on the unification of Bulgaria and Eastern Rumelia. The Bulgarian Prince Alexander I was also drawn to this cause. His relations with Russia had worsened to such extent that the Russian emperor and the pro-Russian circles in Bulgaria openly called for Alexander's abdication. The young prince saw that his support for the Unification is his only chance for political survival.

== Unification ==
The unification was initially scheduled for the middle of September, while the Rumelian militia was mobilized for performing manoeuvres. The plan called for the unification to be announced on 27 September [O.S. 15 September] 1885, but on 14 September [O.S. 2 September] 1885 a riot began in Panagyurishte (then in Eastern Rumelia) that was brought under control the same day by the police. The demonstration demanded unification with Bulgaria. A little later this example was followed in the village of Goliamo Konare. An armed squad was formed there, under the leadership of Prodan Tishkov (mostly known as Chardafon) – the local leader of the BSCRC. BSCRC representatives were sent to different towns in the province, where they had to gather groups of rebels and send them to Plovdiv, the capital of Eastern Rumelia, where they were under the command of Major Danail Nikolaev.

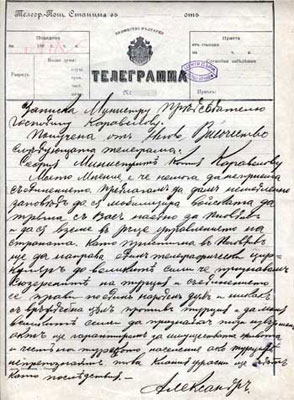
Telegram from the provisional government in Plovdiv to Prince Alexander I proclaiming the unification of Bulgaria

Meanwhile, military manoeuvres were being carried out in the outskirts of Plovdiv. Major Danail Nikolaev, who was in charge of the manoeuvres, was aware of and supported the unionists. On 18 September [O.S. 6 September] 1885, Rumelian militia (Eastern Rumelia's armed forces) and armed unionist groups entered Plovdiv and took over the governor's residence.

The Governor Gavril Krastevich, was arrested by the rebels and paraded through the streets of Plovdiv before being expelled to Constantinople.

A temporary government was formed immediately, with Georgi Stranski at its head. Major Danail Nikolaev was appointed commander of armed forces. With help from Russian officers, he created the strategical plan for defence against the expected Ottoman intervention. Mobilization was declared in Eastern Rumelia.

As soon as it took power on 14 September [O.S. 2 September] 1885, the temporary government sent a telegram, asking the prince to accept the unification. On 20 September [O.S. 8 September] 1885 Alexander I answered with a special manifesto. On the next day, accompanied by the prime minister Petko Karavelov and the head of Parliament Stefan Stambolov, Prince Alexander I entered the capital of the former Eastern Rumelia. This gesture confirmed the unionists' actions as a fait accompli. But the difficulties of the diplomatic and military defence of the union lay ahead.

== International response to unification ==
In the years after the signing of the Berlin treaty, the St. Petersburg government had often expressed its view that the creation of Eastern Rumelia out of southern Bulgaria was an unnatural division and would be short-lived. Russia knew that the Unification would undoubtedly come soon and took important measures for its preparation. First, Russia exerted successful diplomatic pressure upon the Ottoman Empire constraining it from sending forces into Eastern Rumelia. Also, in 1881, in a special protocol, created after the re-establishment of the League of the Three Emperors, it was noted that Austria-Hungary and Germany would show support for a possible union of the Bulgarians.

=== Russia ===
Following the establishment of the Principality of Bulgaria, the head of Russian temporary administration Alexander Dondukov-Korsakov sought to create the foundations for Russian influence over the new state. Upon the ascension of Prince Alexander I to the Bulgarian throne, Russia dispatched numerous military officers and consultants to Bulgaria to further its diplomatic goals in the region. In 1883, Prince Alexander I began removing Russian advisors from their positions in an effort to assert his independence. When Bulgarian revolutionaries removed the pro-Russian governor of Eastern Rumelia Gavril Krastevich, Tsar Alexander III of Russia became enraged, ordering all Russian advisors to abandon Bulgaria and stripped Prince Alexander I of his rank in the Russian military. Thus while Russia supported Bulgaria during the Berlin Congress, it was firmly opposed to Bulgarian unification.

=== United Kingdom ===
In autumn 1885, Prince Alexander I met with British prime minister Lord Salisbury during an official visit to London, convincing him that the establishment of a Greater Bulgaria was within the interests of the British state. While Salisbury had fiercely argued for the separation Eastern Rumelia during the Berlin Congress, he then claimed that the circumstances had changed; and the unification was necessary, as it would prevent Russian expansion towards Constantinople. The government circles in London initially thought that powerful support by St. Petersburg stood behind the bold Bulgarian act. They soon realised the reality of the situation, and after the Russian official position was announced, Great Britain gave its support for the Bulgarian cause, but not until Bulgarian-Ottoman negotiations began.

=== Austria-Hungary ===
Austria-Hungary's position was determined by its policy towards Serbia. In a secret treaty from 1881, Austria-Hungary accepted Serbia's "right" to expand in the direction of Macedonia. Austria-Hungary's aim was to win influence in Serbia, while at the same time directing Serbian territorial appetites towards the south instead of north and north-west. Also, Austria-Hungary had always opposed the creation of a large Slavonic state in the Balkans of the sort that a unified Bulgaria would become.

=== France and Germany ===
They supported the Russian proposal of an international conference in the Ottoman capital.

=== Ottoman Empire ===
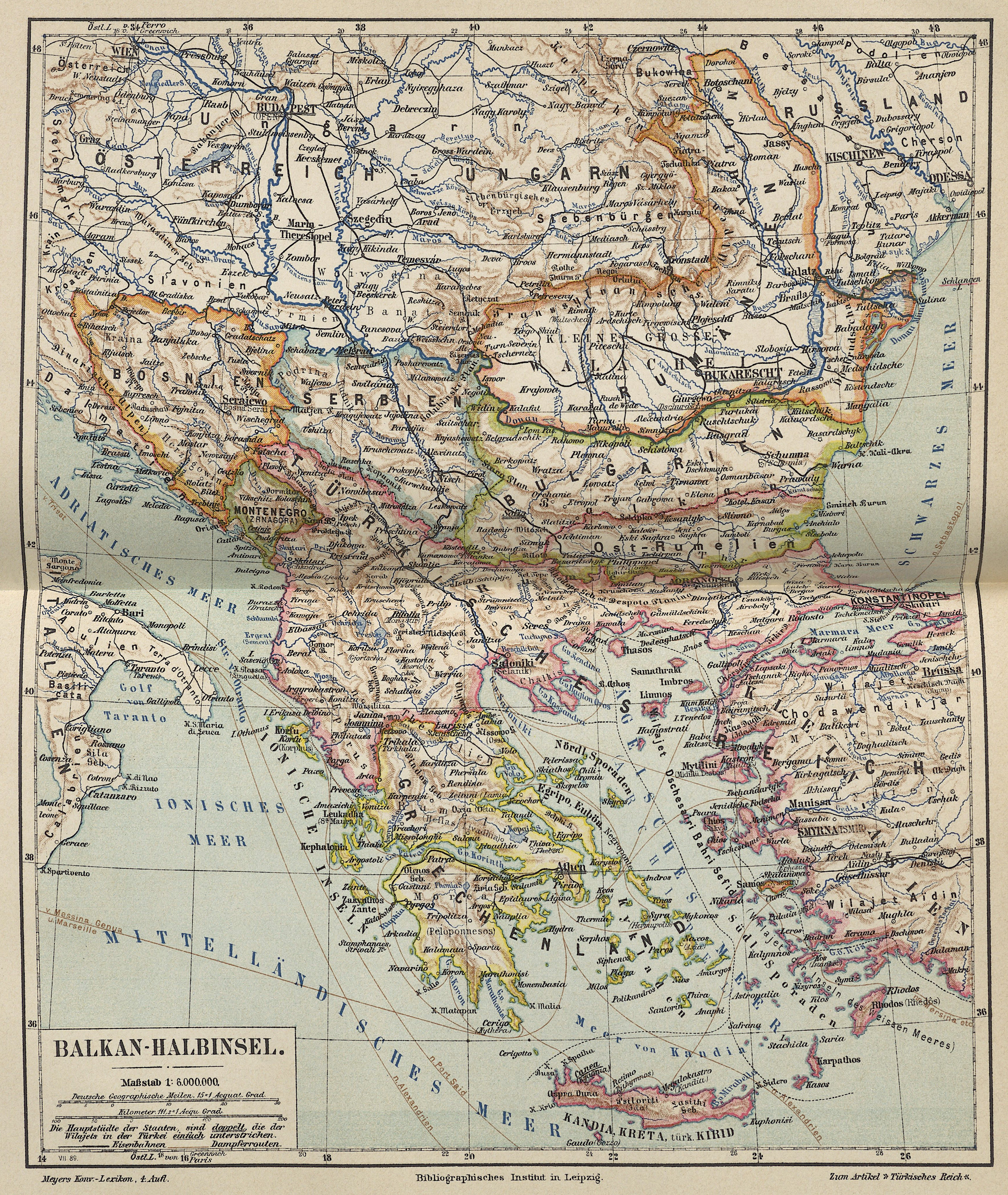
The Balkans after the Unification of Bulgaria

After the unification was already a fact, it took three days for Constantinople to become aware of what had actually happened. A new problem then arose: according to the Berlin treaty the sultan was only allowed to send troops to Eastern Rumelia at the request of Eastern Rumelia's governor. Gavril Krastevich, the governor at the time, made no such request. At the same time the Ottoman Empire was advised in harsh tone both by London and St. Petersburg not to take any such actions and instead to wait for the decision of the international conference. The Ottomans did not attack Bulgaria, nor intervened in the Serbo-Bulgarian War. On 5 April [O.S. 24 March] 1886 the Ottoman Empire and Bulgaria signed the Tophane Agreement, which recognized the Prince of Bulgaria as Governor-General of the autonomous Ottoman Province Eastern Rumelia. In this way, the de facto unification of Bulgaria which had taken place on 18 September [O.S. 6 September] 1885, was de jure recognized.

=== Greece ===
The two official censuses of Eastern Rumelia, in 1880 and 1884, indicated 42,516 and 53,028 Greeks (5.2% and 5.4%), respectively. Following the proclamation of unification, Greek prime minister Theodoros Deligiannis protested against the violation of the Treaty of Berlin along with Serbia. Protests broke out in Athens, Volos, Kalamata and other parts of Greece. The protesters demanded the annexation of Ottoman Epirus in order to counterbalance the strengthening of the Bulgarian state. Deligiannis responded by declaring mobilization on 25 September 1885. Deligiannis informed the Great Powers that he did not intend to get involved in a war with the Ottomans and only sought to appease the pro-war part of the population. Three of his ministers namely Antonopoulos, Zygomalas and Romas urged him to invade Epirus and organize a revolt in Ottoman Crete in order to restore the status quo ante bellum. Ethnic Greeks residing in Constantinople likewise petitioned the sultan to declare war on Bulgaria. The loss of Eastern Rumelia was seen as a threat to the Greek ambition of expanding into Macedonia and uniting all Greek populated lands. Having amassed 80,000 soldiers at the Ottoman border, Deligiannis found himself in a zugzwang. A defeat in a war with the Ottomans could prove disastrous, while the dispersal of the Greek army would mean the loss of popular support, all while the costs of maintaining the army afoot mounted.

On 14 April 1886, the Great Powers (with the exception of France) ordered Greece to demobilize its forces within a week. On 8 May, the Great Powers enacted a naval blockade against Greece (France abstained) in order to force it into demobilizing. Deligiannis resigned from his position citing the blockade, bringing Charilaos Trikoupis back to power. A group of nationalist Greek officers launched incursions across the Ottoman border leading to five days of clashes without Trikoupis's knowledge or approval. Trikoupis demobilized the army and the naval blockade of Greece was lifted on 7 June. Greece had spent 133 million drachmas without achieving any of its foreign policy goals, while its society became deeply polarized between the supporters of Deligiannis and Trikoupis respectively.

=== Serbia ===
Serbia's position was similar to that of Greece. The Serbians asked for considerable territorial compensations along the whole western border with Bulgaria. Rebuffed by Bulgaria, but assured of support from Austria-Hungary, King Milan I declared war on Bulgaria on 14 November [O.S. 2 November] 1885. However, after the decisive Battle of Slivnitsa, the Serbs suffered a quick defeat and the Bulgarians advanced into Serbian territory up to Pirot. Austria-Hungary demanded the ceasing of military actions, threatening that otherwise the Bulgarian forces would meet Austro-Hungarian troops. The ceasefire was signed on 28 November 1885. On 3 March 1886, the peace treaty was signed in Bucharest. According to its terms, no changes were made along the Bulgarian-Serbian border, preserving the unification of Bulgaria.

== Commemoration ==
- The Unification Day is celebrated on 6 September as a national holiday in Bulgaria.
- The town of Saedinenie in Plovdiv Province, Bulgaria, bears the name of the unification of Bulgaria.
- Saedinenie Snowfield on Livingston Island in the South Shetland Islands, Antarctica is named for the unification of Bulgaria.
