= Avren Rocks =

Three adjacent rocks in Micalvi Cove in Robert Island, South Shetland Islands

- Location of Robert Island in the South Shetland Islands

- Location within Antarctica Location within Antarctic Peninsula

Geography
- Location: Antarctica
- Coordinates: 62°26′56″S 59°31′02″W
- Archipelago: South Shetland Islands
- Width: 0.15 km (0.093 mi)

Administration
- Administered under the Antarctic Treaty System

Demographics
- Population: Uninhabited

Avren Rocks (Bulgarian: Скали Аврен, romanized: Skali Avren ska-'li a-'vren) are three adjacent rocks situated in the interior of Micalvi Cove in the south extremity of Robert Island, South Shetland Islands. The group extends 260 m (280 yd) in north–south direction and is 150 m (160 yd) wide. The rocks were first mapped in 2008 by a Bulgarian team. They are named after two settlements in Varna and Kardzhali provinces situated in northeastern and southeastern Bulgaria respectively.

== See also ==
- Composite Antarctic Gazetteer
- List of Antarctic islands south of 60° S
- SCAR
- Territorial claims in Antarctica

== Maps ==
- L.L. Ivanov et al., Antarctica: Livingston Island and Greenwich Island, South Shetland Islands (from English Strait to Morton Strait, with illustrations and ice-cover distribution), Scale 1: 100000 map, Antarctic Place-names Commission of Bulgaria, Ministry of Foreign Affairs, Sofia, 2005
- L.L. Ivanov. Antarctica: Livingston Island and Greenwich, Robert, Snow and Smith Islands. Scale 1:120000 topographic map. Troyan: Manfred Wörner Foundation, 2009. ISBN 978-954-92032-6-4
