= Treaty of Bucharest (1886) =

1886 treaty ending the Serbo-Bulgarian War

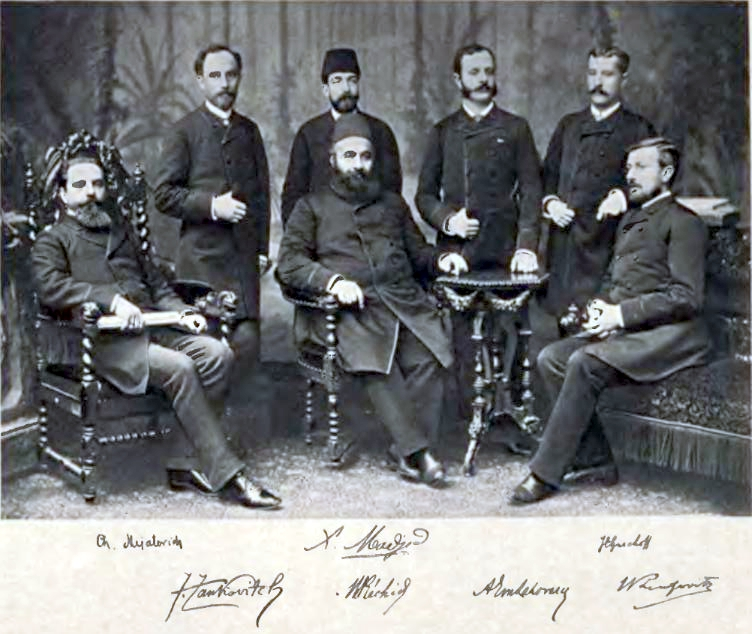
Delegates who signed the treaty

The Treaty of Bucharest was signed by Serbia and Bulgaria on 3 March [O.S. 19 February] 1886 in Bucharest, the capital of Romania, and marked the end of the Serbo-Bulgarian War. The treaty contained a single article, stating that peace between the two countries was restored. The treaty paved the way for the political imperative whereby only the Bulgarian prince could be a governor of Eastern Rumelia.

== See also ==
- Tophane Agreement
- List of treaties
