= Tophane Agreement =

1886 treaty between Bulgaria and the Ottomans

Territory of Bulgaria after signature of the Tophane agreement. Eastern Rumelia ( ) is unified with the Principality of Bulgaria ( ), while the Kardzhali District and Valley of Vacha river (Tamrash Republic) ( ), returned to Ottoman Empire

The Tophane Agreement was a treaty between the Principality of Bulgaria and the Ottoman Empire signed on 5 April [O.S. 24 March] 1886 during an ambassadorial conference in Istanbul. The agreement was named after the Istanbul neighborhood Tophane, located in Beyoğlu district, where the treaty was signed.

Signed by the Ottoman Grand Vizier Mehmed Kamil Pasha and the Bulgarian foreign minister Iliya Tsanov, as well the ambassadors of the Great Powers, the agreement recognized the Prince of Bulgaria (Alexander of Battenberg at the time) as Governor-General of the autonomous Ottoman Province Eastern Rumelia. In this way, the de facto Unification of Bulgaria which had taken place on 18 September [O.S. 6 September] 1885, was de jure recognized.

As compensation, the Ottoman Empire received the area around Kardzhali, as well as the Republic of Tamrash, for a total area of 1,640 km^{2}. With this treaty, the territory of the unified Bulgaria became 94,345 km^{2}. Bulgaria later regained the lands lost in this treaty following victory in the First Balkan War (1912–13).
