= Zahari Stoyanov =

Bulgarian writer and revolutionary (1850–1889)

Zahariy Stoyanov
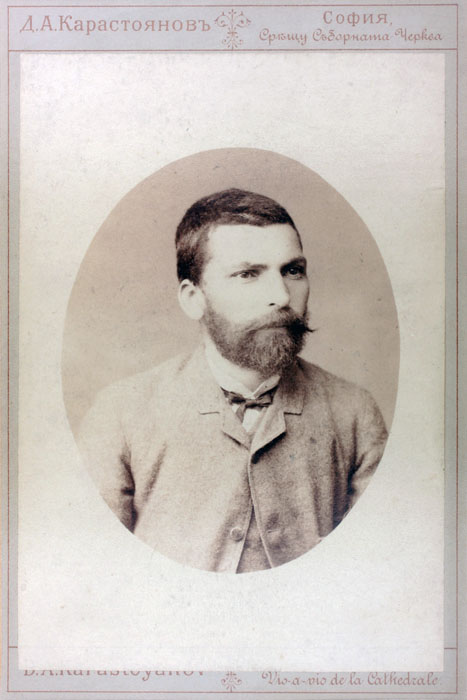
- Born: 1850; Medven, near Sliven, Ottoman Empire (present-day Bulgaria)
- Died: 2 September 1889; Paris, France

Zahariy Stoyanov (Bulgarian: Захарий Стоянов; archaic: Захарий Стоянов) (1850 – 2 September 1889), born Dzhendo Stoyanov Dzhedev (Bulgarian: Джендо Стоянов Джедев), was a Bulgarian revolutionary, writer, and historian.

A participant in the April Uprising of 1876, he became its first historiographer with his book Memoirs of the Bulgarian Uprisings. Stoyanov directed the Unification of Bulgaria and Eastern Rumelia in 1885, and was one of the leaders of the People's Liberal Party until the end of his life.

== Life ==
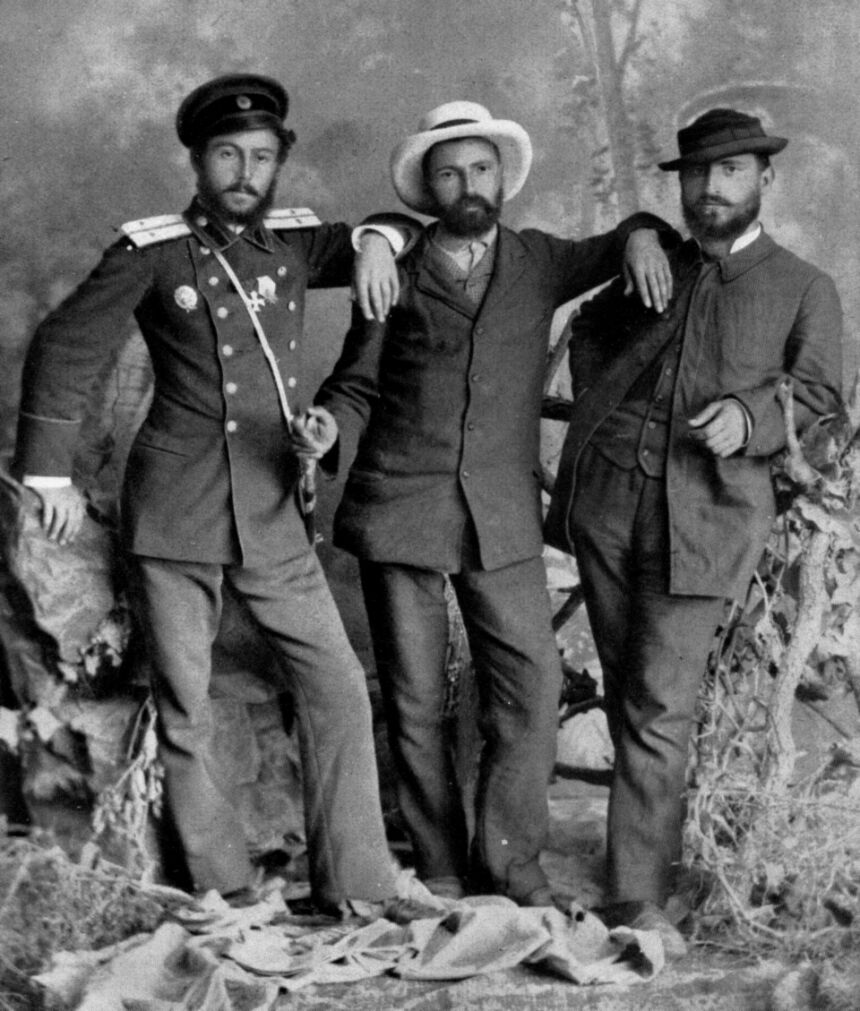
Kosta Panitsa, Zahariy Stoyanov, and Dimitar Rizov in Plovdiv, 1885

Zahariy Stoyanov was born in the family of the shepherd Stoyan Dalakchiev in the village of Medven close to Sliven. He attended the religious school (after 1860 mutual and class school) in his native village between 1856 and 1862 to later become a shepherd in İnceköy (modern Topoli, Varna Province) and Podvis, Burgas Province (1866–1870). While being apprenticed to tailor in Rousse he joined the Rousse revolutionary committee and later worked as a clerk for Baron de Hirsch's railway in modern Simeonovgrad in 1873.

He took part in the Stara Zagora Uprising of 1875 and was one of the "apostles" of the Plovdiv revolutionary district during the time of the April Uprising. After the uprising's suppression he was imprisoned in Plovdiv and later forcibly sent to Medven. He then illegally went to newly liberated Tarnovo in 1877.

After the Liberation of Bulgaria in the Russo-Turkish War of 1877-78 Stoyanov was a member of the Tarnovo Regional Court in 1880. In 1881 he was a secretary of the Court of Appeal and a forensic examining magistrate in Rousse, and he was an employee of the Office of Justice of Eastern Rumelia in 1882–1885.

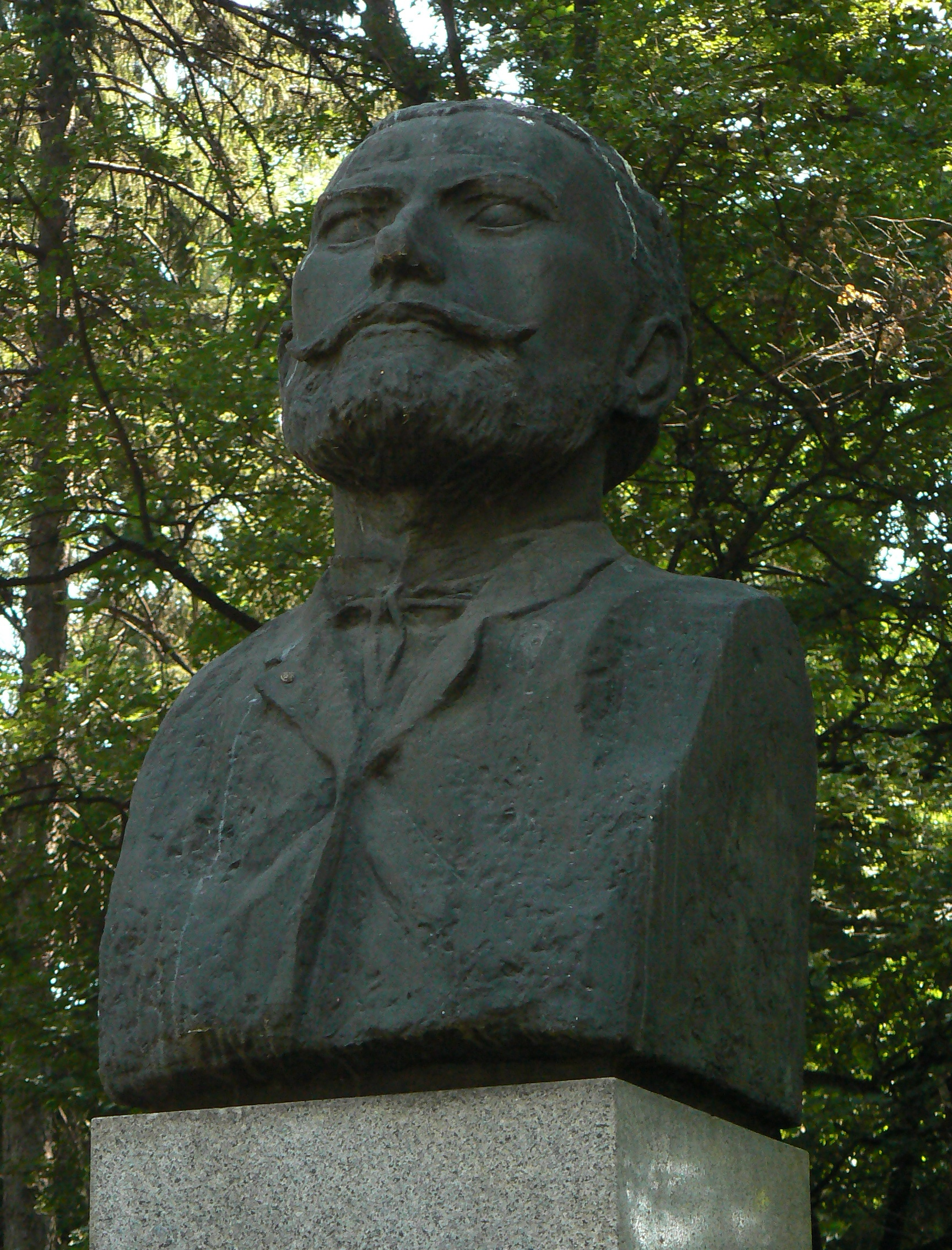
Monument of Stoyanov in the Borisova garden, Sofia

Stoyanov headed the Bulgarian Secret Central Revolutionary Committee (BSCRC) which organized the Unification of Bulgaria and Eastern Rumelia in 1885. He lived in Sofia since 1886, where he actively participated in the activities of the People's Liberal Party. A deputy to the National Assembly of Bulgaria in 1886, he was an assistant chairman in 1887 and a chairman of the Bulgarian Parliament in 1888–1889. Zahariy Stoyanov died in Paris, France on 2 September 1889.

== Literary activity ==
Stoyanov was the author of a number of articles and feuilletons in several newspapers and under various pseudonyms. He was influenced by the political journalism of Lyuben Karavelov and important Russian journalists. Another sphere he worked in were the memoirs and biographies, describing the April Uprising, the lives of Vasil Levski, Hristo Botev, Georgi Benkovski, and other important Bulgarian revolutionary leaders. His Memoirs of the Bulgarian Uprisings. Eyewitness Reports. 1870–1876 is universally accepted as his best work, the product of many years of labour, facts collection, and rationalization.

Zahari Point on Robert Island, South Shetland Islands, Antarctica is named for Zahariy Stoyanov.
