= Kermen =

Kermen Кермен
- Town
- Location in Bulgaria
- Coordinates: 42.504°N 26.256°E
- Country: Bulgaria
- Province: Sliven
- Municipality: Sliven

Government
  - Mayor: Zhivko Tenev Zhechev (GERB)
- Elevation: 160 m (520 ft)

Population (2021)
  - Total: 1,471
- Postal code: 8870

Kermen (Bulgarian: Кермен [ˈkɛrmɛn]) is a small town in Sliven Municipality in Sliven Province, eastern Bulgaria. As of the 2021 Census, it had 1,471 inhabitants.

Kermen Peninsula on Robert Island, South Shetland Islands, Antarctica is named for Kermen.
