= Zahari Point =

Place on Antarctica

Location of Robert Island in the South Shetland Islands.

Topographic map of Livingston Island, Greenwich, Robert, Snow and Smith Islands.

Zahari Point (Nos Zahari \'nos za-'ha-ri\) is an ice-free point on the southwest coast of Robert Island in the South Shetland Islands, Antarctica forming the northwest side of the entrance to Micalvi Cove. Ice-free surface area 21 hectares (52 acres). The feature is named after the Bulgarian writer and historiographer Zahari Stoyanov (1850–1889).

== Location ==
The point is located at 62°26′58″S 59°32′08″W, which is 6.8 km southeast of Negra Point, 1.8 km east-southeast of Beron Point, and 2 km northwest of Edwards Point (British mapping in 1968, and Bulgarian in 2005 and 2009).

== Map ==
- L.L. Ivanov et al. Antarctica: Livingston Island and Greenwich Island, South Shetland Islands. Scale 1:100000 topographic map. Sofia: Antarctic Place-names Commission of Bulgaria, 2005.
