= Micalvi Cove =

Location of Robert Island in the South Shetland Islands.

Topographic map of Livingston Island, Greenwich, Robert, Snow and Smith Islands.

Micalvi Cove is a 1.9 km wide cove indenting for 1.35 km the southwest coast of Robert Island in the South Shetland Islands, Antarctica next northwest of Kermen Peninsula, and entered between Edwards Point and Zahari Point. Avren Rocks are situated in the interior of the cove. The area was visited by early 19th century sealers.

The feature is named after the cutter Micalvi which took part in one of the Chilean Antarctic expeditions.

== Location ==
The cove's midpoint is located at 62°26′59″S 59°31′14″W (British mapping in 1968, Chilean in 1971, Argentine in 1980, and Bulgarian in 2005 and 2009).

== See also ==
- Robert Island
- South Shetland Islands

== Maps ==
- L.L. Ivanov et al. Antarctica: Livingston Island and Greenwich Island, South Shetland Islands. Scale 1:100000 topographic map. Sofia: Antarctic Place-names Commission of Bulgaria, 2005.
- L.L. Ivanov. Antarctica: Livingston Island and Greenwich, Robert, Snow and Smith Islands. Scale 1:120000 topographic map. Troyan: Manfred Wörner Foundation, 2009. ISBN 978-954-92032-6-4
