= Beron Point =

Point on the southwest coast of Robert Island, Antarctica

Coordinates: 62°26′33″S 59°34′35″W

Location of Robert Island in the South Shetland Islands.

Topographic map of Livingston Island, Greenwich, Robert, Snow and Smith Islands.

Beron Point (Nos Beron \'nos be-'ron\) is a point on the southwest coast of Robert Island, Antarctica situated 4.5 km southeast of Negra Point, 1.7 km west of Bajo Nunatak, 1.8 km west-northwest of Zahari Point, and 3.7 km northwest of Edwards Point, as well as 5 km northeast of Ash Point on Greenwich Island. Its shape has been enhanced by a recent glacier retreat north-northwest of the point. It was named after the Bulgarian scientist and educator Petar Beron (died 1871).

== Maps ==
- L.L. Ivanov et al. Antarctica: Livingston Island and Greenwich Island, South Shetland Islands. Scale 1:100000 topographic map. Sofia: Antarctic Place-names Commission of Bulgaria, 2005.
- L.L. Ivanov. Antarctica: Livingston Island and Greenwich, Robert, Snow and Smith Islands. Scale 1:120000 topographic map. Troyan: Manfred Wörner Foundation, 2009. ISBN 978-954-92032-6-4
