= Republic of Tamrash =

State in southern Bulgaria from 1878 to 1886

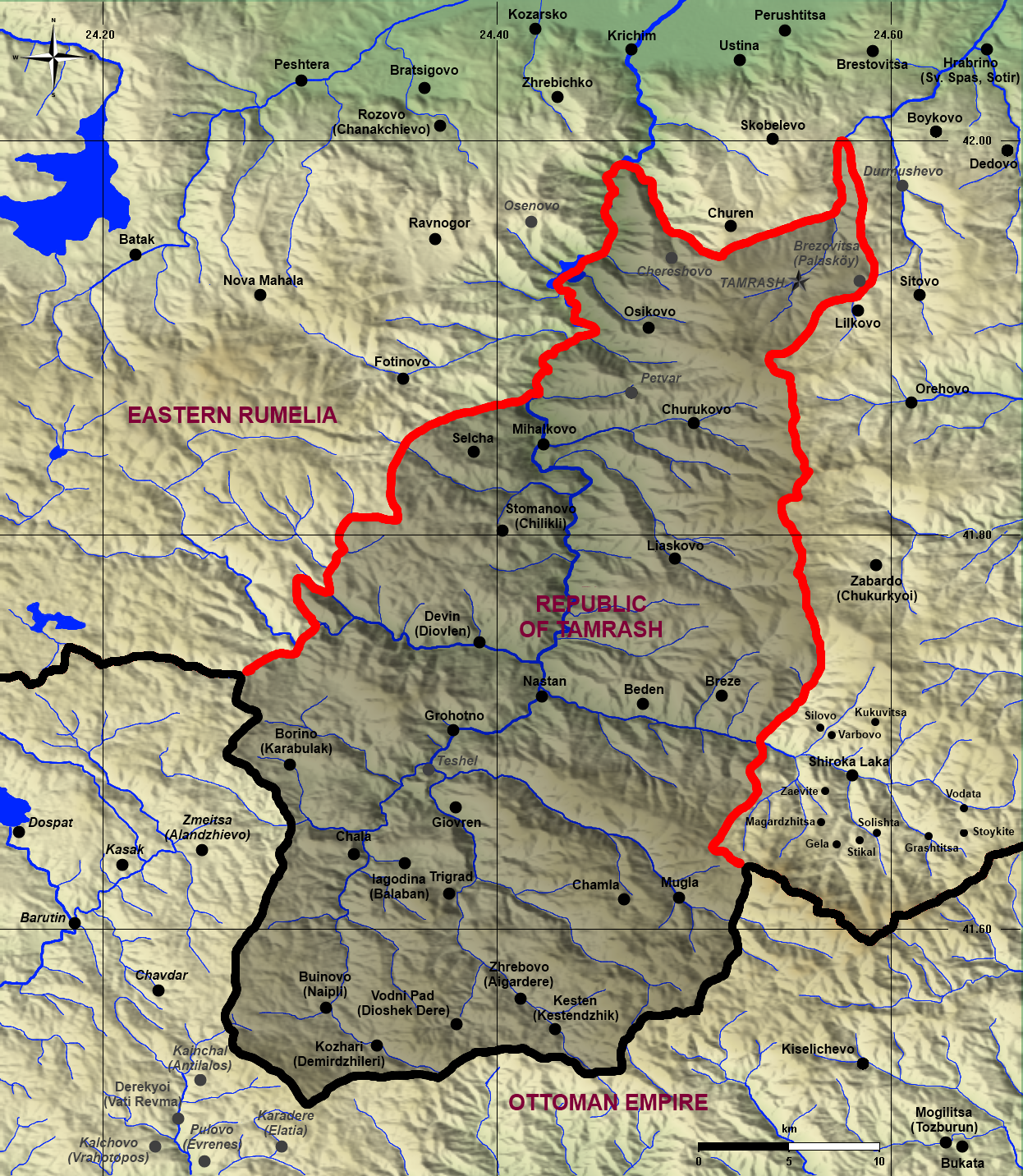
Map of the republic of Tamrash.

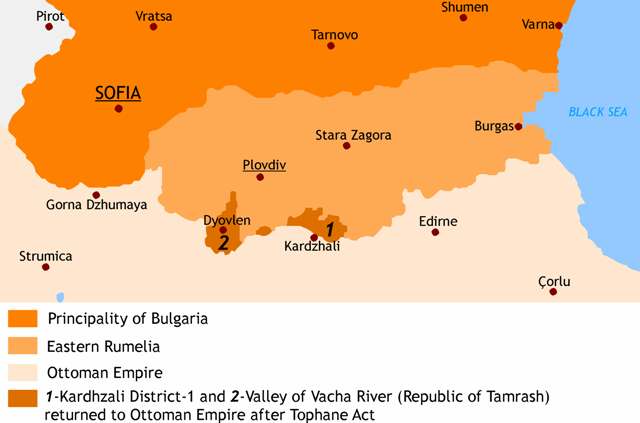
The Republic of Tamrash with number two on the map.

The Republic of Tamrash (Bulgarian: Тъмръшка република, romanized: Tǎmrǎška republika), was a short-lived self-governing administrative structure of the Pomaks, living in the Tamrash region of the Rhodope Mountains. It existed from 1878 to 1886.

== Geography ==
The territory spanned over the area locked in the upper valley of the Vacha River and most of its tributaries. The rebel territory initially consisted of 17 villages but their number increased to 21 in 1880. Some of those villages were Trigrad, Mugla, Beden, Mihalkovo, Skobelevo, Churukovo and Devin.

== History ==
The republic survived until 1886, when Eastern Rumelia was incorporated into Bulgaria. Then the area was returned to the Ottoman Empire.

== See also ==
- Provisional Government of Western Thrace
