= Devesilovo =

Devesilovo Девесилово
- Village
- Location within Bulgaria
- Coordinates: 41.3373°N 25.6668°E
- Country: Bulgaria
- Province: Kardzhali Province
- Municipality: Krumovgrad
- Elevation: 539 m (1,768 ft)
- Time zone: UTC+2 (EET)
  - Summer (DST): UTC+3 (EEST)

Devesilovo is a village in Krumovgrad Municipality, Kardzhali Province, southern Bulgaria.

== Landmarks ==
In the neighboring village of Chernichevo, located 16 km (10 miles) east, The White River is notable for being the first river in the Eastern Rhodopes included in the "Natura 2000" ecological network. The river is famous for its winding course, which creates various shapes known as "The meanders of the White River."

The village of Egrek, situated 8 km (5 miles) southwest, is home to five operational mills, which are recognized as cultural monuments. These mills are crucial for the local community as they provide the only means to grind flour for bread. Two of these mills are located near the asphalt road, making them accessible for visitors.

A traditional fair, known as "The Fair of the Devesils," is held annually in early May. This event takes place in the area referred to as "The Monument," also known to locals as "Stork Gully," which lies between the villages of Malak Devesil, Golyam Devesil, Devesilovo, and Devesilitsa.
