= Principality of Bulgaria =

1878–1908 Ottoman vassal state in the Balkans

Coordinates: 42°42′N 23°20′E

Principality of Bulgaria Княжество България (Bulgarian) Knyazhestvo Bălgariya
- 1878–1908
- Flag State coat of arms (1881–1927)
- Motto: Съединението прави силата Saedinenieto pravi silata ("Unity makes strength")
- Anthem: "Шуми Марица"; Shumi Maritsa; Maritsa Rushes (1886–1908) Royal anthem: "Боже, Царя храни!" Bozhe, Tsarya khrani! God Save the Tsar!
- Principality of Bulgaria (dark green) and Eastern Rumelia (light green), united in 1885, formally as a personal union.: Principality of Bulgaria; Eastern Rumelia
- Status: Vassal of the Ottoman Empire
- Capital: Plovdiv (1878) (Provisional Russian Administration in Bulgaria); Sofia (1878–1908) (Provisional Russian Administration in Bulgaria until June 1879); Tarnovo (1879) (Bulgarian Constituent Assembly election, 1879)
- Official languages: Bulgarian
- Religion: Orthodox Christianity, Sunni Islam (minority)
- Demonym: Bulgarian
- Government: Absolute monarchy (1878–1879); Constitutional monarchy (from 1879)
- Knyaz (Prince)
  - 1879–1886: Alexander I
  - 1887–1908: Ferdinand I
- Regents
  - 1886–1887: Stefan Stambolov
  - 1886–1887: Sava Mutkurov
  - 1886–1887: Petko Karavelov
- Chairman of the Council of Ministers
  - 1879 (first): Todor Burmov
  - 1908 (last): Aleksandar Malinov
- Legislature: None (rule by decree) (1878–1879); National Assembly (from 1879)
- History
  - Treaty of San Stefano: 3 March 1878
  - Treaty of Berlin: 13 July 1878
  - Constitution: 28 April 1879
  - Unification: 6 September 1885
  - Independence: 5 October 1908
- Currency: Bulgarian lev
| Preceded by | Succeeded by |
| Danube Vilayet; Eastern Rumelia | Tsardom of Bulgaria |
- Today part of: Bulgaria; Serbia

The Principality of Bulgaria (Bulgarian: Княжество България, romanized: Knyazhestvo Balgariya) was a vassal state under the suzerainty of the Ottoman Empire. It was established by the Treaty of Berlin in 1878.

After the Russo-Turkish War ended with a Russian victory, the Treaty of San Stefano was signed by Russia and the Ottoman Empire on 3 March 1878. Under this, a large Bulgarian vassal state was agreed to, which was significantly larger: its lands encompassed nearly all ethnic Bulgarians in the Balkans, and included most of Moesia, Thrace and Macedonia, stretching from the Black Sea to the Aegean. However, the United Kingdom and Austria-Hungary were against the establishment of such a large Russian client state in the Balkans, fearing it would shift the balance of power in the Mediterranean. Due to this, the great powers convened and signed the Treaty of Berlin, superseding the Treaty of San Stefano, which never went into effect. This created a much smaller principality, alongside an autonomous Eastern Rumelia within the Ottoman Empire.

In practice, Bulgaria's status as an Ottoman vassal was a legal fiction, and Bulgaria only acknowledged the authority of the Sublime Porte in a formal way. It had its own Constitution, flag and anthem, and conducted its own foreign policy. From 1880, it had its own currency as well. In 1885, a bloodless revolution resulted in Eastern Rumelia being de facto annexed by Bulgaria, which the Ottoman Empire accepted with the Tophane Agreement. On 5 October [O.S. 22 September] 1908, Bulgaria formally declared its independence as the Kingdom of Bulgaria.

== Background ==
In 1396 the Bulgarian–Ottoman Wars ended with the fall of the Bulgarian Empire, due to the Ottoman invasion of the Balkans and its own internal divisions. Under Ottoman rule, the Bulgarian nobility was destroyed and the national consciousness suppressed. The Bulgarian National Revival, emerging in the late 18th century, revived Bulgarian identity and stoked the idea of creating a new Bulgarian state. Numerous revolutionary movements and uprisings against the Ottomans occurred alongside similar movements in the rest of the Balkans, culminating in the Russo-Turkish War of 1877 to 1878.

== Treaty of Berlin ==
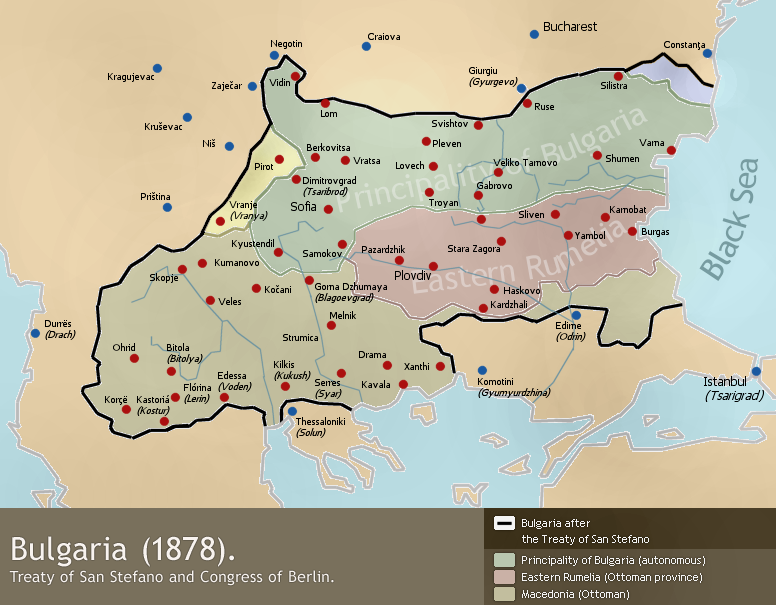
The Treaty of San Stefano and Treaty of Berlin

The Treaty of San Stefano of March 3, 1878, proposed a Bulgarian state, which comprised the geographical regions of Moesia, Thrace and Macedonia. Based on that date Bulgarians celebrate Bulgaria's national day each year.

Fearing the establishment of a large Russian client state on the Balkans, the other great powers, however, were not willing to agree to the treaty. As a result, the Treaty of Berlin (1878), under the supervision of Otto von Bismarck of Germany and Benjamin Disraeli of the United Kingdom, revised the earlier treaty, and scaled back the proposed Bulgarian state.

A widely autonomous Principality of Bulgaria was created, between the Danube and the Stara Planina range, with its seat at the old Bulgarian capital of Veliko Turnovo, and including Sofia. This state was to be under nominal Ottoman sovereignty but was to be ruled by a prince elected by a congress of Bulgarian notables and approved by the Powers. They insisted that the Prince could not be a Russian, but in a compromise Prince Alexander of Battenberg, a nephew of Tsar Alexander II, was chosen. An autonomous Ottoman province under the name of Eastern Rumelia was created south of the Stara Planina range, whereas Macedonia was returned under the sovereignty of the Sultan.

== 19th century ==
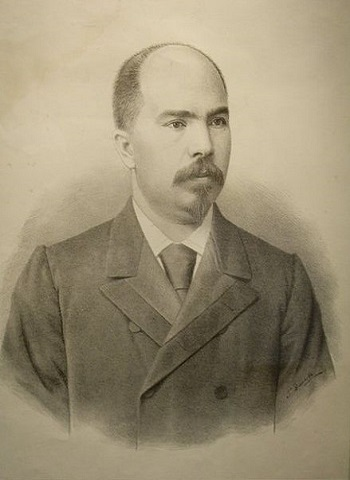
Stefan Stambolov

The Bulgarians adopted an advanced democratic constitution, and power soon passed to the Liberal Party led by Stefan Stambolov. Prince Alexander had conservative leanings, and at first opposed Stambolov's policies, but by 1885 he had become sufficiently sympathetic to his new country to change his mind, and supported the Liberals. He also supported the Unification of Bulgaria and Eastern Rumelia, which was brought about by a coup in Plovdiv in September 1885. The Powers did not intervene because of the power struggles between them. Shortly after, Serbia declared war on Bulgaria in the hope of grabbing territory while the Bulgarians were distracted. The Bulgarians defeated them at Slivnitsa, pushed the Serbian army into Serbia and succeeded in reconquering the territory seized by the Berlin Treaty - Bulgarian populated towns of Pirot and Vranya, but they were given back to Serbia with the Treaty of Bucharest in 1886.

These events made Alexander very popular in Bulgaria, but Russia was increasingly dissatisfied at the liberal tendencies under his reign. In August 1886 they fomented a coup, in the course of which Alexander was forced to abdicate and was exiled to Russia. Stambolov, however, acted quickly and the participants in the coup were forced to flee the country. Stambolov tried to reinstate Alexander, but strong Russian opposition forced the prince to abdicate again. In July 1887 the Bulgarians elected Ferdinand of Saxe-Coburg-Gotha as their new Prince. Ferdinand was the "Austrian candidate" and the Russians refused to recognise him. Ferdinand initially worked with Stambolov, but by 1894 their relationship worsened. Stambolov resigned and was assassinated in July 1895. Ferdinand then decided to restore relations with Russia, which meant returning to a conservative policy. At the end of the century, changes in taxation policy resulted in extensive peasant unrest, primarily centered in northeastern Bulgaria. Protests gradually evolved into open rebellions in 1900, but were suppressed by the government using the army.

== 20th century ==
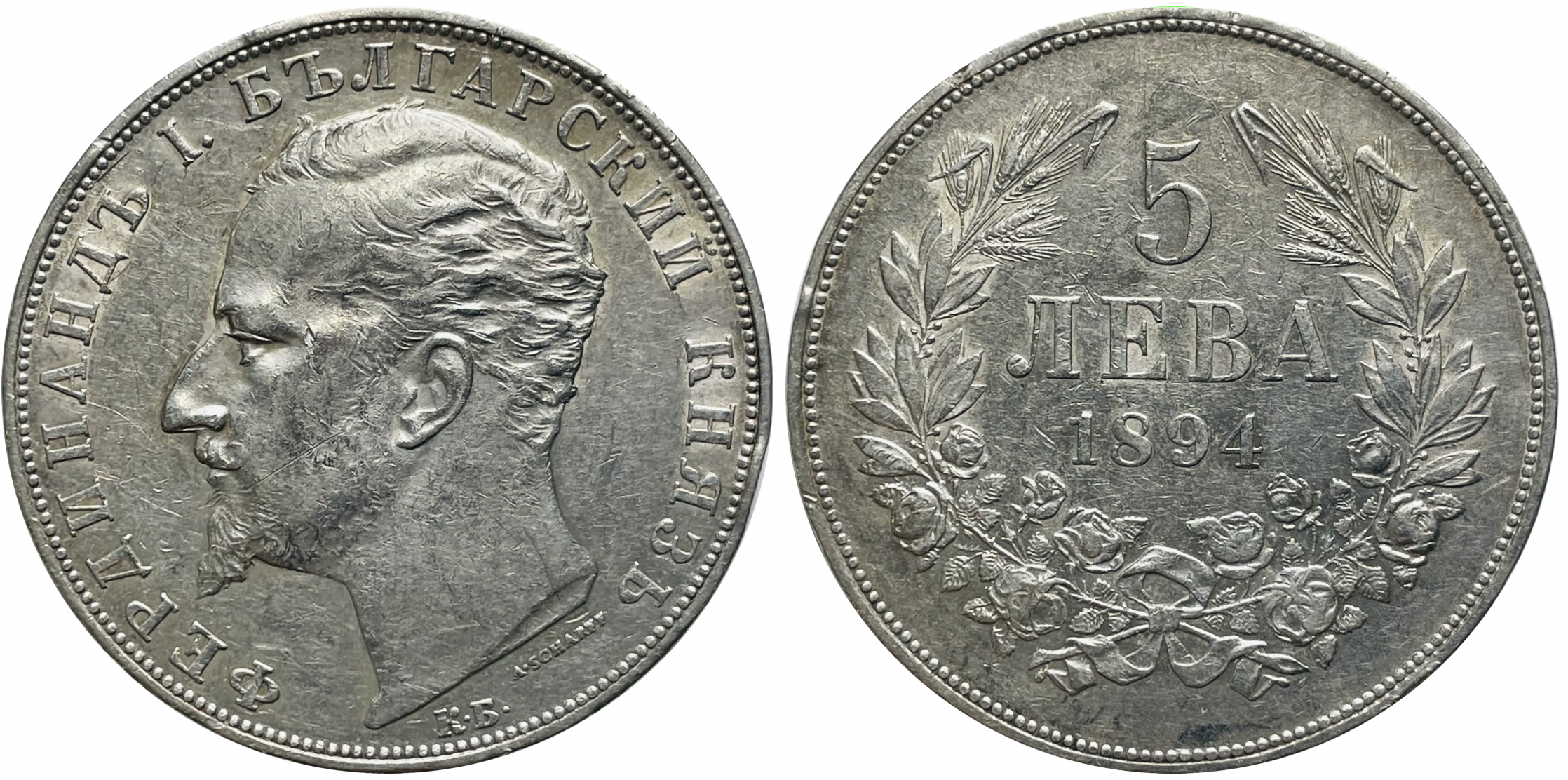
Silver coin: 5 leva - Ferdinand I of Bulgaria, 1894

There was a substantial Bulgarian population still living under Ottoman rule, particularly in Macedonia and Adrianople. To complicate matters, Serbia and Greece too made claims over parts of Macedonia, while Serbia, as a Slavic nation, also considered Macedonians as belonging to the Serbian nation. Thus began a five-sided struggle for control of these areas which lasted until 1912. In 1903 the Ilinden–Preobrazhenie Uprising broke out in Ottoman Macedonia, making war seem likely. In the Aftermath of the Young Turk Revolution, Ferdinand used the struggles between the Great Powers to break free from Ottoman suzerainty. On 5 October 1908, Ferdinand declared the Independence of the Tsardom of Bulgaria at the Holy Forty Martyrs Church in Veliko Tarnovo, although since the introduction of the Gregorian calendar in 1916, this has been celebrated on 22 September.

=== Ilinden-Preobrazhenie Uprising ===
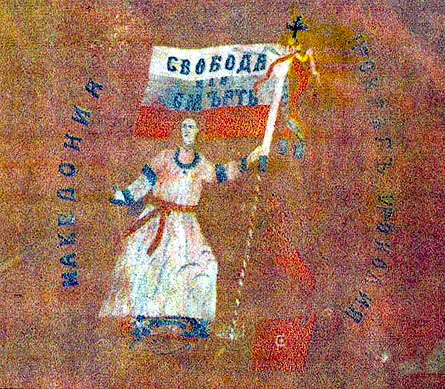
An IMARO banner

The main external political problem confronting Bulgaria throughout the period up to World War I was the fate of Macedonia and Eastern Thrace. At the end of 19th century the Internal Macedonian-Adrianople Revolutionary Organization was founded and began the preparation of an armed uprising in the regions still occupied by the Ottoman Turks. Relying in part on nationwide support on the part of the Principality of Bulgaria, IMARO got down to organizing a network of committees in Macedonia and Thrace. In August 1903 a mass armed uprising, known in history as the Ilinden-Preobrajenie, broke out in Macedonia and Thrace. Its aim was to liberate those regions, or at least to draw the attention of the Great Powers and make them advocate for the improvement of the living conditions for the population through legal and economic reforms. After three months of fierce battles the Ottoman army crushed the uprising using much cruelty against the civilian population.

== List of princes of Bulgaria ==
| Portrait | Name | Birth | Death | From | Until | Notes |
|---|---|---|---|---|---|---|
| | Alexander I | 5 April 1857 | 23 October 1893 | 29 April 1879 | 7 September 1886 | Abdicated |
| | Ferdinand I | 26 February 1861 | 10 September 1948 | 29 April 1887 | 5 October 1908 | Became King of Bulgaria in 1908 |

== Gallery ==
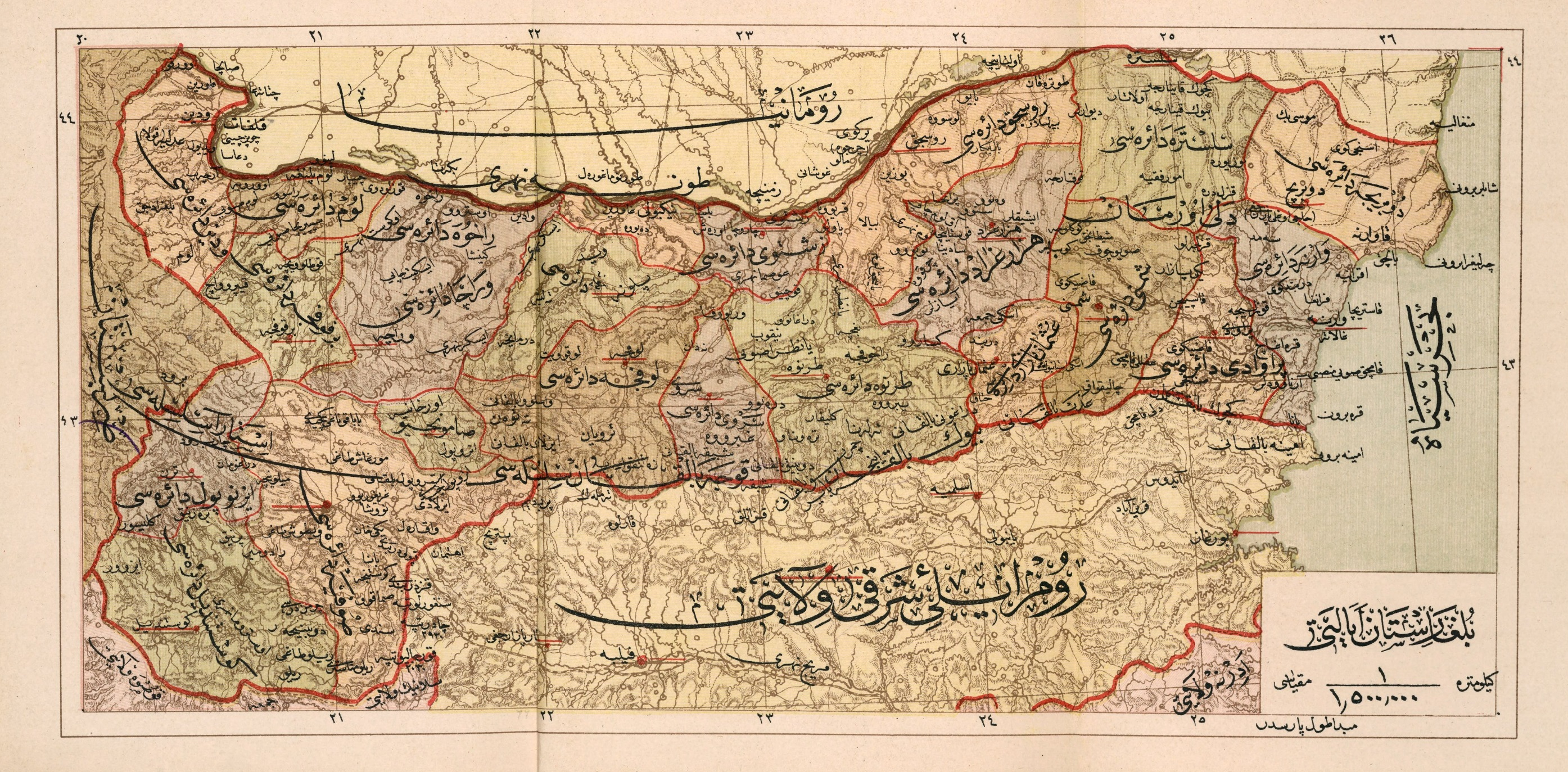
Administrative subdivisions of Bulgaria in 1907

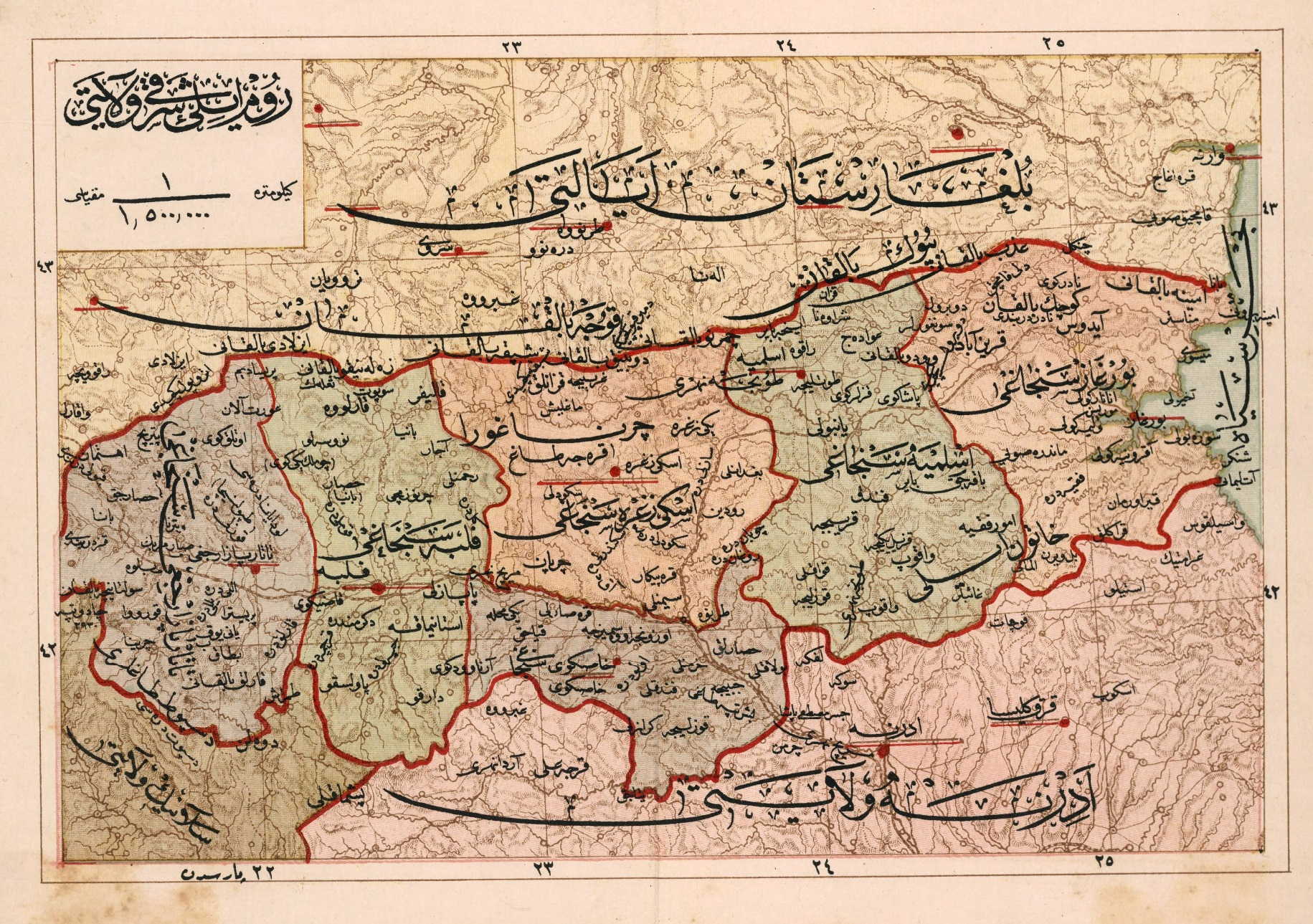
Administrative subdivisions of Eastern Rumelia in 1907

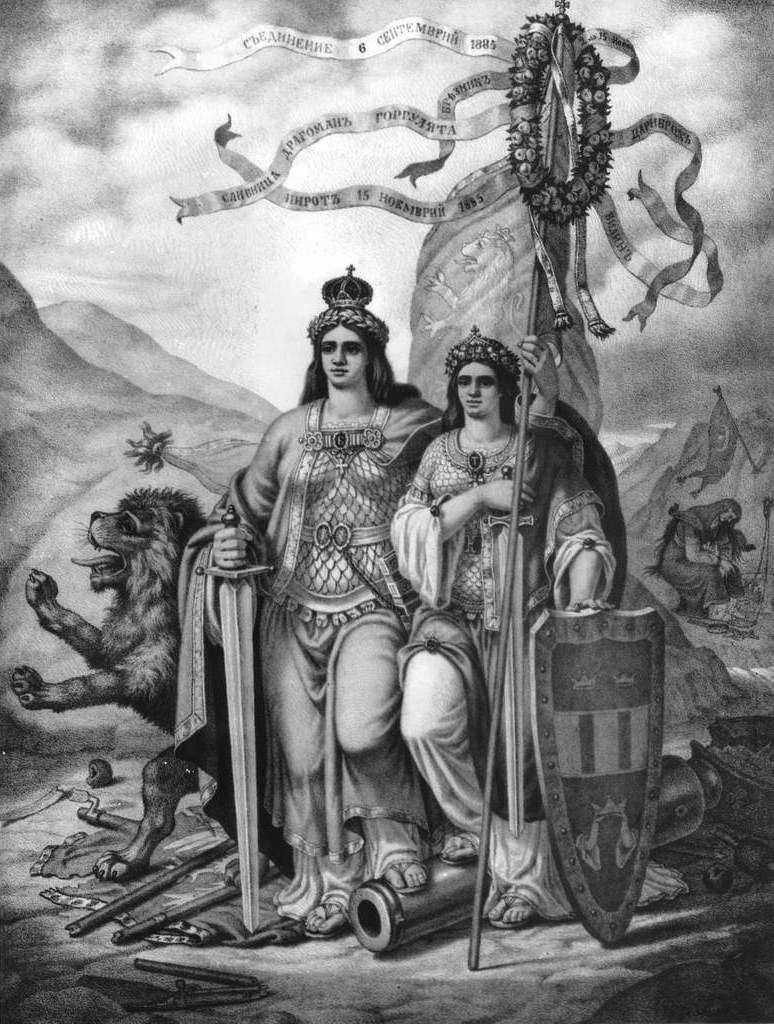
Bulgarian unification of 1885

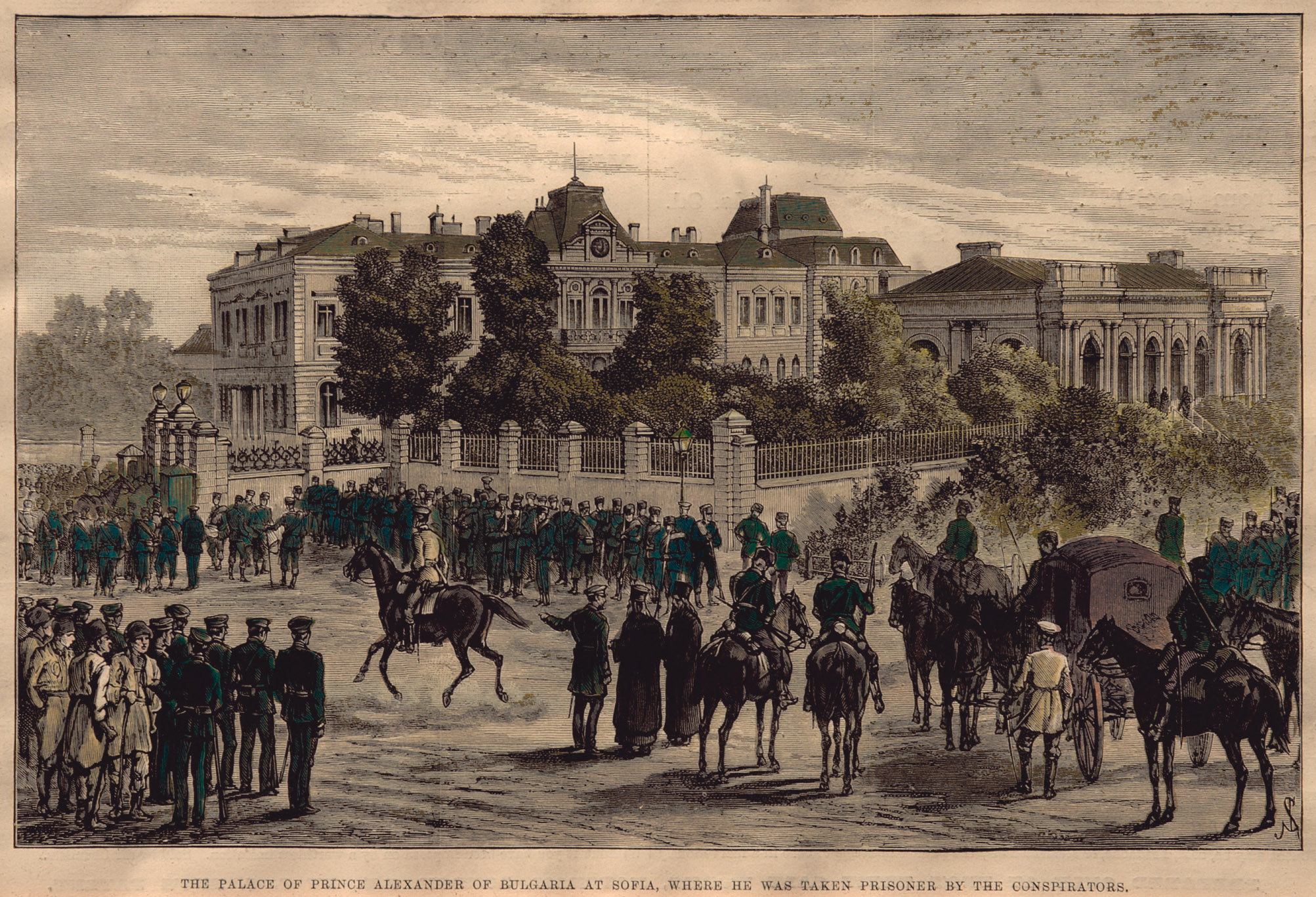
The 1886 Bulgarian coup d'état

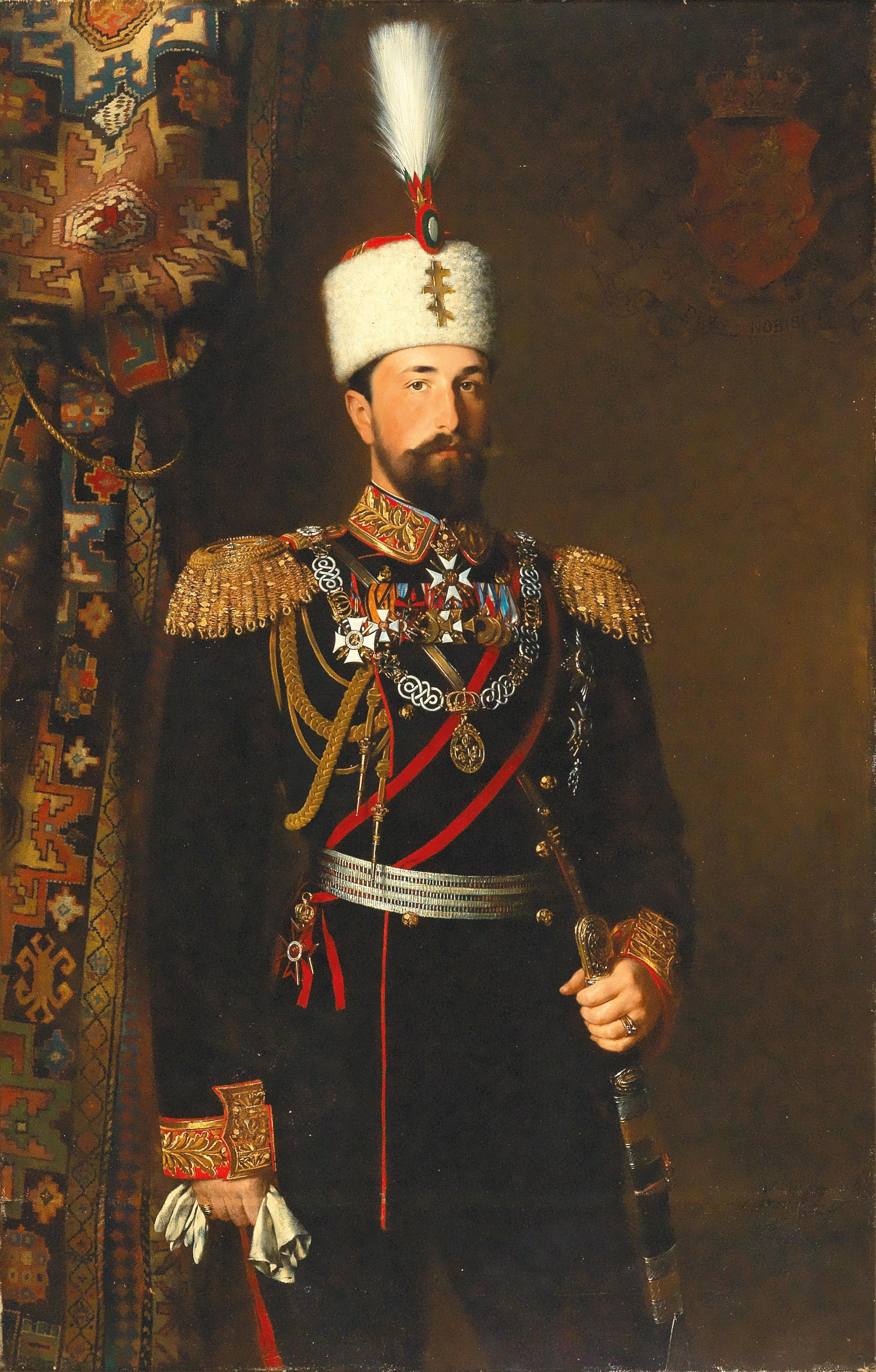
Portrait of Prince Alexander

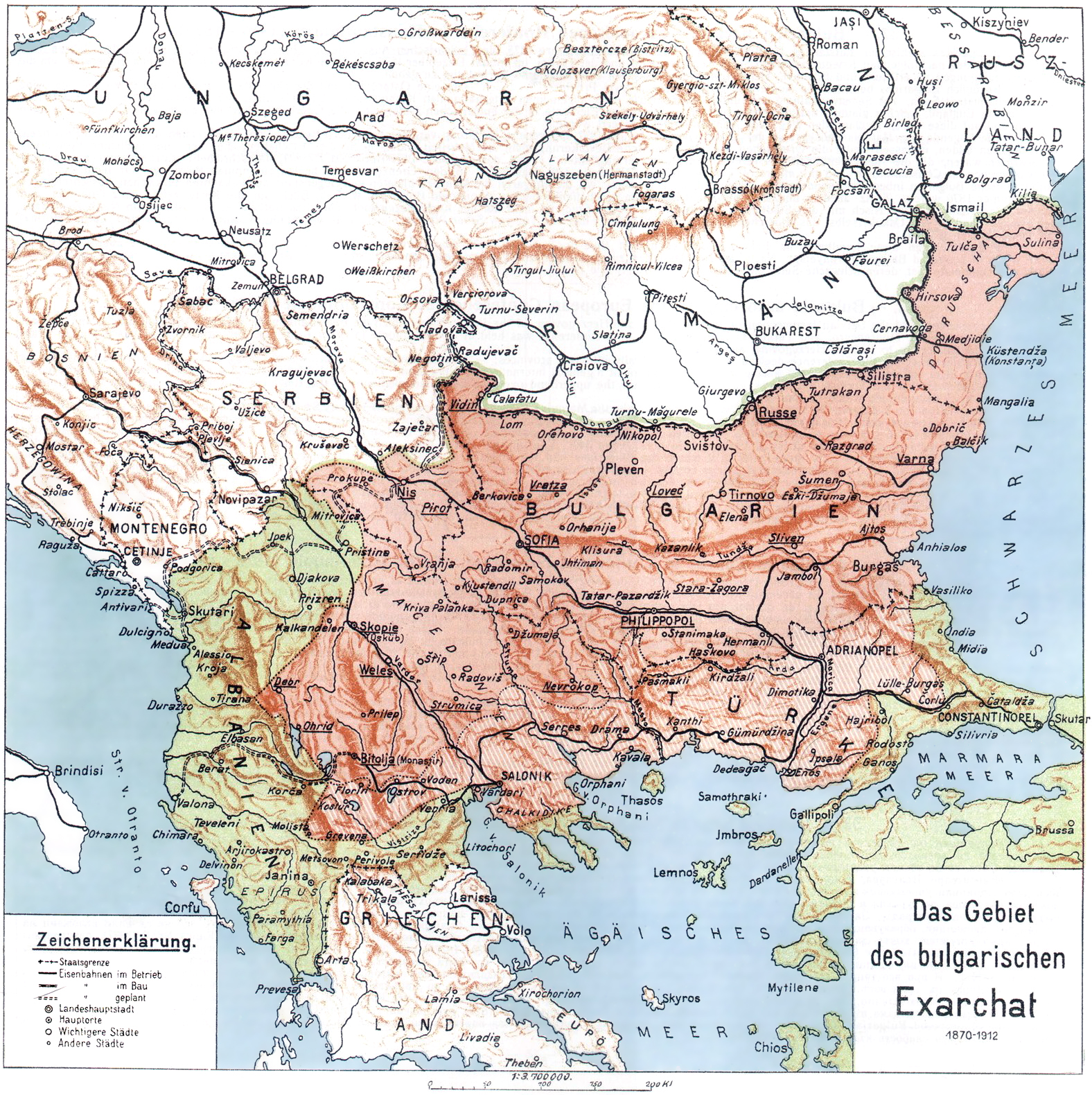
Territory of the Bulgarian Exarchate from 1870 to 1913

== See also ==
- History of Bulgaria (1878–1946)
