= Kermen Peninsula =

Coordinates: 62°27′13″S 59°30′00″W

Location of Robert Island in the South Shetland Islands.

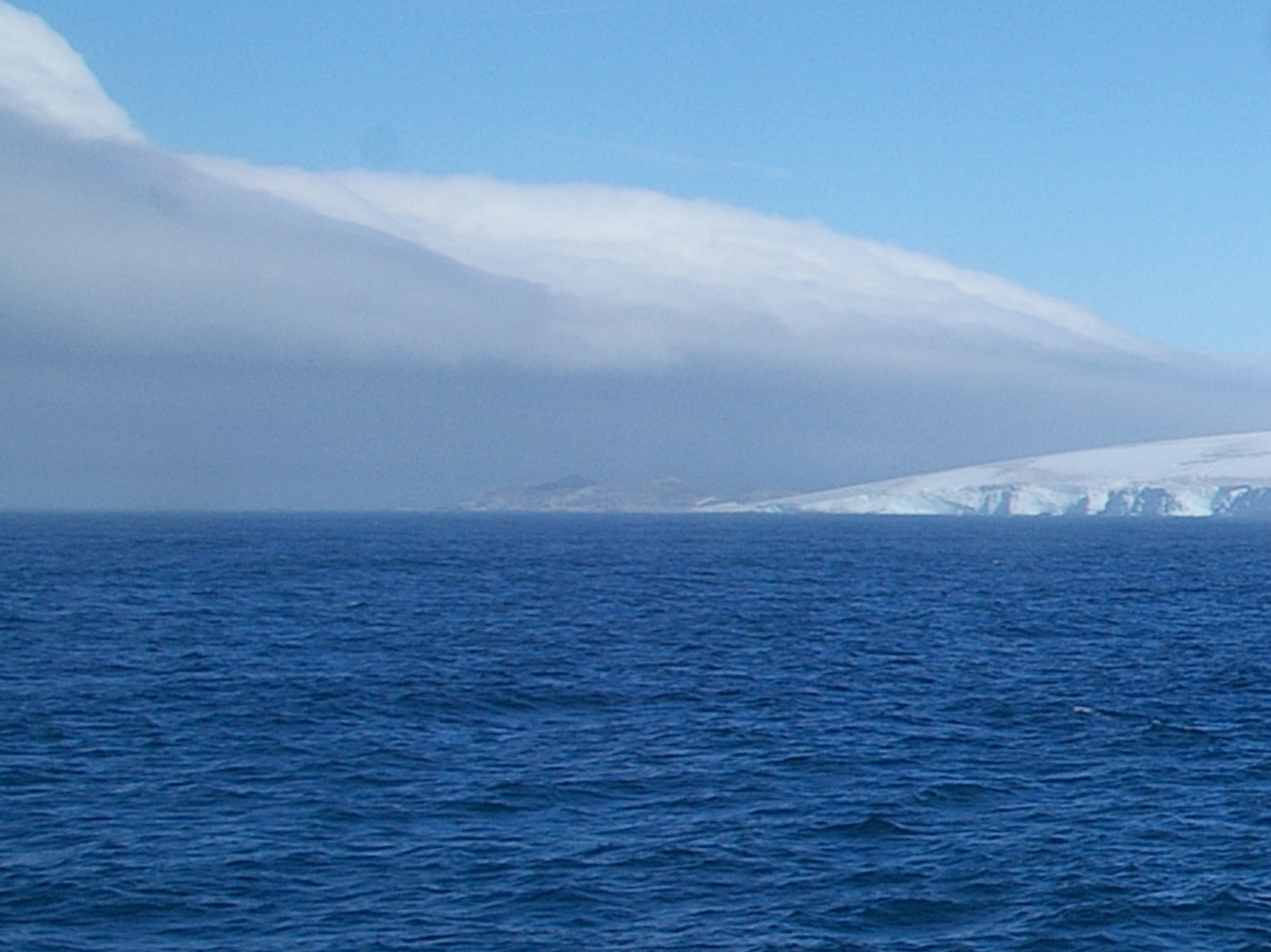
Kermen Peninsula

Topographic map of Livingston Island, Greenwich, Robert, Snow and Smith Islands.

Kermen Peninsula (Bulgarian: полуостров Кермен, romanized: poluostrov Kermen, IPA: [poɫuˈɔstrof ˈkɛrmɛn]) is a 1.5-km long peninsula forming the south extremity of Robert Island, Antarctica. Bounded by Micalvi Cove to the northwest, and Bransfield Strait to the southeast. Its extremity Edwards Point is forming the east side of the south entrance to English Strait and the southwest side of the entrance to Devesil Bight. The southwest half — ca. 121 hectares (300 acres) — is snow-free in summer. British mapping in 1968, and Bulgarian in 2005 and 2009. Named after the town of Kermen in southeastern Bulgaria.

== Map ==
- L.L. Ivanov et al., Antarctica: Livingston Island and Greenwich Island, South Shetland Islands (from English Strait to Morton Strait, with illustrations and ice-cover distribution), Scale 1: 100000 map, Antarctic Place-names Commission of Bulgaria, Ministry of Foreign Affairs, Sofia, 2005
