= Edwards Point =

Headland of Robert Island in the South Shetland Islands

Location of Robert Island in the South Shetland Islands.

Topographic map of Livingston Island, Greenwich, Robert, Snow and Smith Islands.

Edwards Point is a rocky point in the south extremity of Kermen Peninsula and Robert Island in the South Shetland Islands, Antarctica. The point is a southeast entrance point of English Strait and forms the west side of the entrance to Devesil Bight and the southeast side of the entrance to Micalvi Cove. The area was visited by early 19th century sealers.

The feature is named after Victor Edwards, a draughtsman in the British Admiralty Hydrographic Office during the 1930s.

== Location ==
The point is located at 62°27′46″S 59°29′57″W which is 5.04 km northeast of Santa Cruz Point, Greenwich Island, 4.57 km southeast of Beron Point, and 6.14 km west-southwest of Robert Point (British mapping in 1935 and 1968, and Bulgarian in 2005 and 2009).

== See also ==
- Robert Island
- South Shetland Islands

== Maps ==
- L.L. Ivanov et al. Antarctica: Livingston Island and Greenwich Island, South Shetland Islands. Scale 1:100000 topographic map. Sofia: Antarctic Place-names Commission of Bulgaria, 2005.
- L.L. Ivanov. Antarctica: Livingston Island and Greenwich, Robert, Snow and Smith Islands. Scale 1:120000 topographic map. Troyan: Manfred Wörner Foundation, 2009. ISBN 978-954-92032-6-4
