= Eastern Rumelia =

Autonomous territory in the Ottoman Empire from 1878–1885

Eastern Rumelia Източна Румелия (Bulgarian) Ανατολική Ρωμυλία (Greek) روم‌ایلی شرقی ولایتی (Ottoman Turkish)
- Autonomous Province of Ottoman Empire (in personal union with Bulgaria from 1886)
- 1878–1885
- Flag Coat of arms

- Principality of Bulgaria (dark green) and Eastern Rumelia (light green) after the Berlin Congress in 1878, formally in personal union from 1886.: Eastern Rumelia; Principality of Bulgaria
- Capital: Plovdiv
- Population
  - 1884: 975,030
- Government
  - Type: Autonomous Province
- Governor-General
  - 1879–1884: Aleksandar Bogoridi
  - 1884–1885: Gavril Krastevich
  - 1886: Aleksandar I
  - 1887–1908: Ferdinand I
- History
  - Established: 1878
  - Treaty of Berlin: 13 July 1878
  - United with Bulgaria: 6 September 1885
  - Independence: 5 October 1908
| Preceded by | Succeeded by |
| Adrianople Vilayet | Principality of Bulgaria |
- Today part of: Bulgaria

Eastern Rumelia (Bulgarian: Източна Румелия, romanized: Iztochna Rumeliya; Ottoman Turkish: روم‌ایلی شرقی ولایتی, romanized: Rumeli-i Şarkî Vilayeti; Greek: Ανατολική Ρωμυλία, romanized: Anatoliki Romylia) was an autonomous province (oblast in Bulgarian, vilayet in Turkish) of the Ottoman Empire with a total area of 32,978 km^{2} (12,733 sq mi), which was created in 1878 by virtue of the Treaty of Berlin and de facto ceased to exist in 1885, when it was united with the Principality of Bulgaria, also under nominal Ottoman suzerainty. It continued to be an Ottoman province de jure until 1908, when Bulgaria declared independence. Ethnic Bulgarians formed a majority of the population in Eastern Rumelia, but there were significant Turkish and Greek minorities. Its capital was Plovdiv (Ottoman Filibe, Greek Philippoupoli). The official languages of Eastern Rumelia were Bulgarian, Greek and Ottoman Turkish.

== History ==
Eastern Rumelia was created as an autonomous province within the Ottoman Empire by the Treaty of Berlin in 1878. The region roughly corresponded to today's southern Bulgaria, which was also the name the Russians proposed for it; this proposal was rejected by the British. It encompassed the territory between the Balkan Mountains, the Rhodope Mountains and Strandzha, a region known to all its inhabitants—Bulgarians, Ottoman Turks, Greeks, Roma, Armenians and Jews—as Northern Thrace. The artificial name, Eastern Rumelia, was given to the province on the insistence of the British delegates to the Congress of Berlin: the Ottoman notion of Rumelia refers to all European regions of the empire, i.e. those that were in Antiquity under the Roman Empire. Some twenty Pomak (Bulgarian Muslim) villages in the Rhodope Mountains refused to recognize Eastern Rumelian authority and formed the so-called Republic of Tamrash.

The province is remembered today by philatelists for having issued postage stamps from 1880 on. See the main article, Postage stamps and postal history of Eastern Rumelia.

=== Unification with Bulgaria ===
After a bloodless revolution on 6 September 1885, the province was annexed by the Principality of Bulgaria, which was de jure an Ottoman tributary state but de facto functioned as independent. After the Bulgarian victory in the subsequent Serbo-Bulgarian War, the status quo was recognized by the Porte with the Tophane Agreement on 24 March 1886. With the Tophane Act, Sultan Abdul Hamid II appointed the Prince of Bulgaria (without mentioning the name of the incumbent prince Alexander of Bulgaria) as Governor-General of Eastern Rumelia, thus retaining the formal distinction between the Principality of Bulgaria and Eastern Rumelia and preserving the letter of the Berlin Treaty. However, it was clear to the Great Powers that the union between the Principality of Bulgaria and Eastern Rumelia was permanent, and not to be dissolved. The Republic of Tamrash and the region of Kardzhali were reincorporated in the Ottoman Empire. The province was nominally under Ottoman suzerainty until Bulgaria became de jure independent in 1908. 6 September, Unification Day, is a national holiday in Bulgaria.

== Government ==
According to the Treaty of Berlin, Eastern Rumelia was to remain under the political and military jurisdiction of the Ottoman Empire with significant administrative autonomy (Article 13). The law frame of Eastern Rumelia was defined with the Organic Statute which was adopted on 14 April 1879 and was in force until the Unification with Bulgaria in 1885. According to the Organic Statute the head of the province was a Christian Governor-General appointed by the Sublime Porte with the approval of the Great Powers. The legislative organ was the Provincial Counsel which consisted of 56 persons, of which 10 were appointed by the governor-general, 10 were permanent and 36 were directly elected by the people.

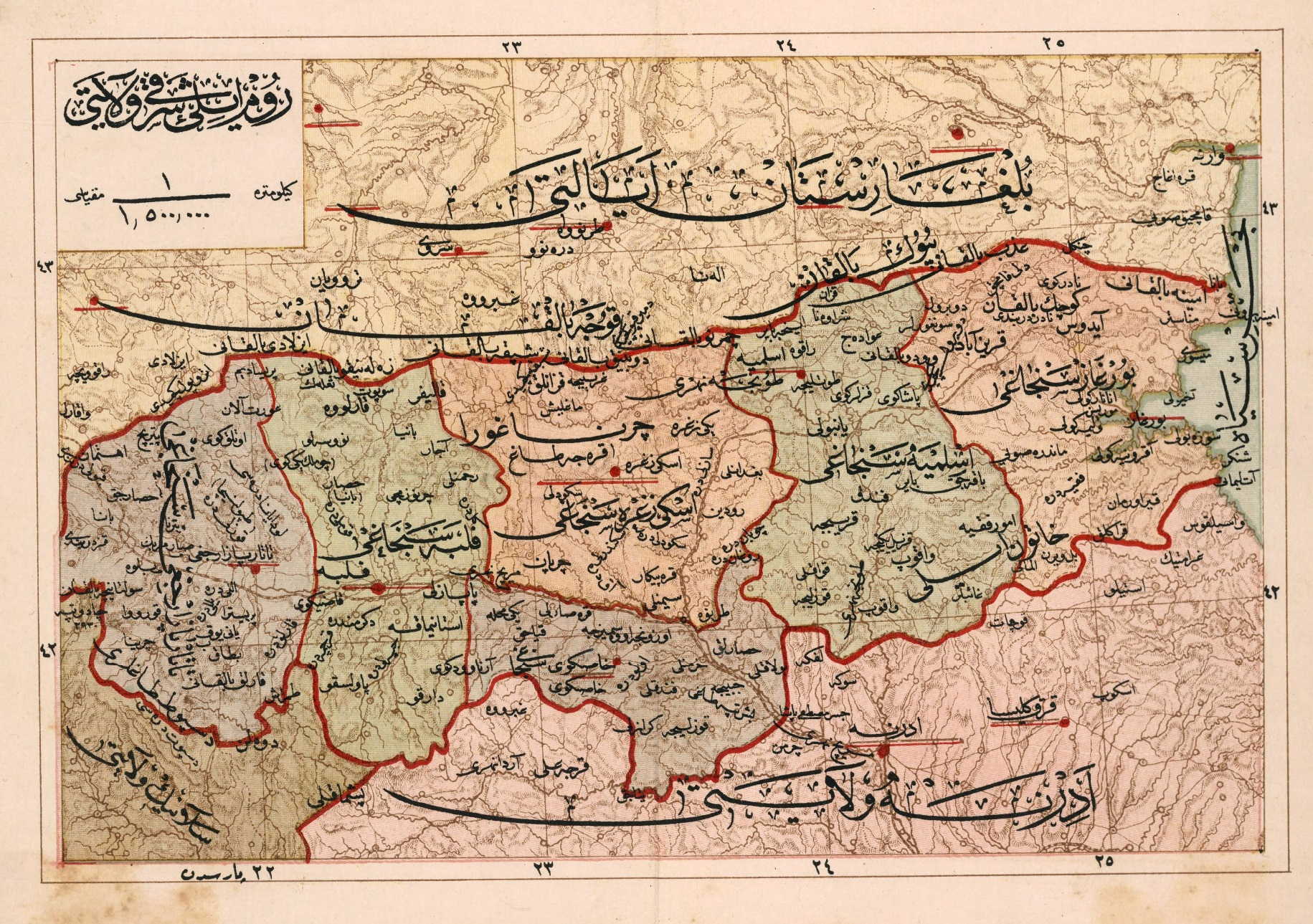
Map of subdivisions of Eastern Rumelia Vilayet in 1907, as shown on an Ottoman Atlas

Arkady Stolypin was the Russian civil administrator from 9 October 1878 to 18 May 1879. The first governor-general was Prince Alexander Bogoridi (1879–1884), a Bulgarian aristocrat, who was acceptable to both Bulgarians and Greeks in the province. The second governor-general was Gavril Krastevich (1884–1885), a Bulgarian historian.

During the period of Bulgarian annexation Georgi Stranski was appointed as a commissioner for South Bulgaria (9 September 1885 – 5 April 1886), and when the province was restored to nominal Ottoman sovereignty, but still under Bulgarian control, the prince of Bulgaria was recognized by the Sublime Porte as the governor-general in the Tophane Agreement of 1886.

=== Governors-general ===
| No. | Portrait | Name (Birth–Death) | Term of office | | |
| No. | Portrait | Name (Birth–Death) | Took office | Left office | Duration |
|---|---|---|---|---|---|
| 1 | | Knyaz Aleksandar Bogoridi (1822–1910) | 18 May 1879 | 26 April 1884 | 4 years, 344 days |
| 2 | | Gavril Krastevich (1813–1898) | 26 April 1884 | 18 September 1885 | 1 year, 145 days |
| 3 | | Knyaz Aleksandar I of Bulgaria (1857–1893) | 17 April 1886 | 7 September 1886 | 143 days |
| 4 | | Knyaz Ferdinand I of Bulgaria (1861–1948) | 7 July 1887 | 5 October 1908 | 21 years, 90 days |

== Administrative divisions ==
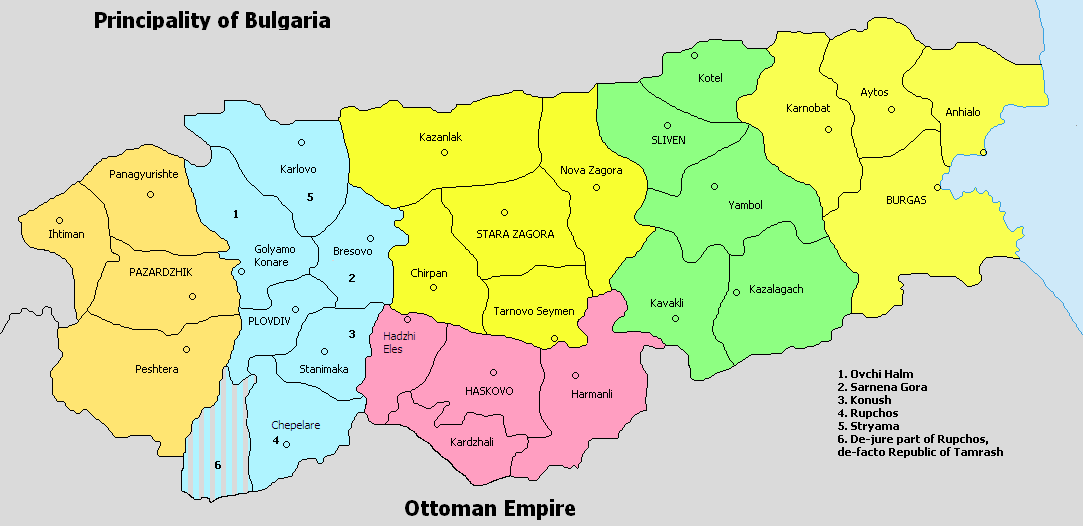
Map of the administrative divisions of Eastern Rumelia before annexation by the Principality of Bulgaria.

Eastern Rumelia consisted of the departments (called in Bulgarian окръзи okrazi, in Ottoman terminology sanjaks) of Plovdiv (Пловдив, Filibe), Tatarpazardzhik (Татарпазарджик, Tatarpazarcığı), Haskovo (Хасково, Hasköy), Stara Zagora (Стара Загора, Eski Zağra), Sliven (Сливен, İslimye) and Burgas (Бургас, Burgaz), in turn divided into 28 cantons (equivalent to Bulgarian околии okolii, Ottoman kazas).

The cantons were:

- Department of Plovdiv: Plovdiv, Konush (the canton seat was in Stanimaka), Ovchi Halm (seat in Golyamo Konare), Stryama (seat in Karlovo), Sarnena Gora (seat in Brezovo) and Rupchos (seat in Chepelare) (Note: The western part of this canton refused to recognize the authority of Eastern Rumelia, formed the so-called Republic of Tamrash and in 1886 was ceded back to the Ottoman Empire by the Tophane Agreement)
- Department of Pazardzhik: Pazardzhik, Peshtera, Panagyurishte and Ihtiman
- Department of Haskovo: Haskovo, Hadzhi Eles, Harmanli and Kardzhali (Note: The canton of Kardzhali was ceded back to the Ottoman Empire by the Tophane Agreement)
- Department of Stara Zagora: Stara Zagora, Kazanlak, Chirpan, Nova Zagora and Tarnovo Seymen
- Department of Sliven: Sliven, Yambol, Kazalagach, Kavakli and Kotel
- Department of Burgas: Burgas, Anhialo, Karnobat and Aytos

== Population and ethnic demographics ==
=== Pre 1878 ===
The following is a district-by-district population extract from the 1876 Ottoman salname for the Vilayet of Adrianople, which is in turn based on the vilayet-wide census of 1875. As is common for Ottoman statistics, figures refer to males only, including Ottoman soldiers stationed in the region (figures at the bottom are male-female aggregated estimates):

Ethnoconfessional Groups per Kaza in the Future Eastern Rumelia in 1876 Based on the 1875 Adrianople Vilayet Census
Kaza (District)
| Kaza (District) | Islam millet | % | Bulgar & Rum millet | % | Ermeni millet | % | Roman Catholic | % | Yahudi millet | % | Muslim Roma | % | Non-Muslim Roma | % | Total | % |
|---|---|---|---|---|---|---|---|---|---|---|---|---|---|---|---|---|
| Filibe/Plovdiv | 35,400 | 28.1 | 80,165 | 63.6 | 380 | 0.3 | 3,462 | 2.7 | 691 | 0.5 | 5,174 | 4.1 | 495 | 0.4 | 125,767 | 100.00 |
| Pazarcık/Pazardzhik | 10,805 | 22.8 | 33,395 | 70.5 | 94 | 0.2 | - | 0.0 | 344 | 0.7 | 2,120 | 4.5 | 579 | 1.2 | 47,337 | 100.00 |
| Hasköy/Haskovo | 33,323 | 55.0 | 25,503 | 42.1 | 3 | 0.0 | - | 0.0 | 65 | 0.1 | 1,548 | 2.6 | 145 | 0.2 | 60,587 | 100.00 |
| Zağra-i Atik/Stara Zagora | 6,677 | 20.0 | 24,857 | 74.5 | - | 0.0 | - | 0.0 | 740 | 2.2 | 989 | 3.0 | 90 | 0.3 | 33,353 | 100.00 |
| Kızanlık/Kazanlak | 14,365 | 46.5 | 14,906 | 48.2 | - | 0.0 | - | 0.0 | 219 | 0.7 | 1,384 | 4.5 | 24 | 0.0 | 30,898 | 100.00 |
| Çırpan/Chirpan | 5,158 | 23.9 | 15,959 | 73.8 | - | 0.0 | - | 0.0 | - | 0.0 | 420 | 1.9 | 88 | 0.4 | 21,625 | 100.00 |
| ~~Ahi Çelebi/Smolyan~~^{1} | ~~8,197~~ | ~~57.8~~ | ~~5,346~~ | ~~37.7~~ | ~~268~~ | ~~1.9~~ | - | ~~0.0~~ | - | ~~0.0~~ | ~~377~~ | ~~2.7~~ | - | ~~0.0~~ | ~~14,188~~ | ~~100.00~~ |
| ~~Sultanyeri/Momchilgrad~~^{1} | ~~13,336~~ | ~~96.9~~ | ~~262~~ | ~~1.9~~ | - | ~~0.0~~ | - | 0.0 | - | 0.0 | ~~159~~ | 1.2 | - | 0.0 | ~~13,757~~ | ~~100.00~~ |
| Filibe sanjak subtotal | 105,728 | 33.07 | 194,785 | 60.92 | 477 | 0.15 | 3,642 | 1.14 | 2,059 | 0.64 | 11,635 | 3.64 | 1,421 | 0.44 | 319,747 | 100.00 |
| İslimye/Sliven | 8,392 | 29.8 | 17,975 | 63.8 | 143 | 0.5 | - | 0.0 | 158 | 0.6 | 596 | 2.1 | 914 | 3.2 | 28,178 | 100.00 |
| Yanbolu/Yambol | 4,084 | 30.4 | 8,107 | 60.4 | - | 0.0 | - | 0.0 | 396 | 3.0 | 459 | 3.4 | 377 | 3.2 | 13,423 | 100.00 |
| Misivri/Nesebar | 2,182 | 40.0 | 3,118 | 51.6 | - | 0.0 | - | 0.0 | - | 0.0 | 153 | 2.8 | - | 0.0 | 5,453 | 100.00 |
| Karinâbâd/Karnobat | 7,656 | 60.5 | 3,938 | 31.1 | - | 0.0 | - | 0.0 | 250 | 2.0 | 684 | 5.4 | 125 | 1.0 | 12,653 | 100.00 |
| Aydos/Aytos | 10,858 | 76.0 | 2,735 | 19.2 | 19 | 0.1 | - | 0.0 | 36 | 0.2 | 584 | 4.1 | 46 | 0.3 | 14,278 | 100.00 |
| Zağra-i Cedid/Nova Zagora | 5,310 | 29.4 | 11,777 | 65.2 | - | 0.0 | - | 0.0 | - | 0.0 | 880 | 4.9 | 103 | 0.6 | 18,070 | 100.00 |
| Ahyolu/Pomorie | 1,772 | 33.7 | 3,113 | 59.2 | - | 0.0 | - | 0.0 | - | 0.0 | 378 | 7.2 | 2 | 0.0 | 5,265 | 100.00 |
| Burgas | 4,262 | 22.1 | 14,179 | 73.6 | 46 | 0.2 | - | 0.0 | 4 | 0.0 | 448 | 2.3 | 320 | 1.6 | 19,259 | 100.00 |
| Islimiye sanjak subtotal | 44,516 | 38.2 | 64,942 | 55.7 | 208 | 0.2 | - | 0.0 | 844 | 0.6 | 4,182 | 3.6 | 1,887 | 1.6 | 116,579 | 100.00 |
| Male Population Islimiye & Filibe sanjak | 150,244 | 34.43 | 259,727 | 59.53 | 685 | 0.16 | 3,642 | 0.83 | 2,903 | 0.67 | 15,817 | 3.63 | 3,308 | 0.76 | 436,362 | 100.00 |
| Total Population^{3} Islimiye & Filibe sanjak | 300,488 | 34.43 | 519,454 | 59.53 | 1,370 | 0.16 | 7,284 | 0.83 | 5,806 | 0.67 | 31,634 | 3.63 | 6,616 | 0.76 | 872,652 | 100.00 |
| Kızılağaç/Elhovo^{2} | 1,425 | 9.6 | 11,489 | 89.0 | N/A | N/A | N/A | N/A | N/A | N/A | N/A | N/A | N/A | N/A | 12,914 | 100.00 |
| Manastir/Topolovgrad^{2} | 409 | 1.5 | 26,139 | 98.5 | N/A | N/A | N/A | N/A | N/A | N/A | N/A | N/A | N/A | N/A | 26,548 | 100.00 |
| Eastern Rumelia GRAND TOTAL^{3} | 302,322 | 33.15 | 557,082 | 61.08 | 1,370 | 0.15 | 7,284 | 0.79 | 5,806 | 0.64 | 31,634 | 3.47 | 6,616 | 0.72 | 912,114 | 100.00 |
^{1}Kaza to remain in the Ottoman Empire.^{2}Figures available for total population and for Islam millet and Bulgar millet/Rum millet only.^{3} Male/female aggregated figures presuming equal number of men and women, as suggested by Ubicini and Palairet.

=== Post 1878 ===
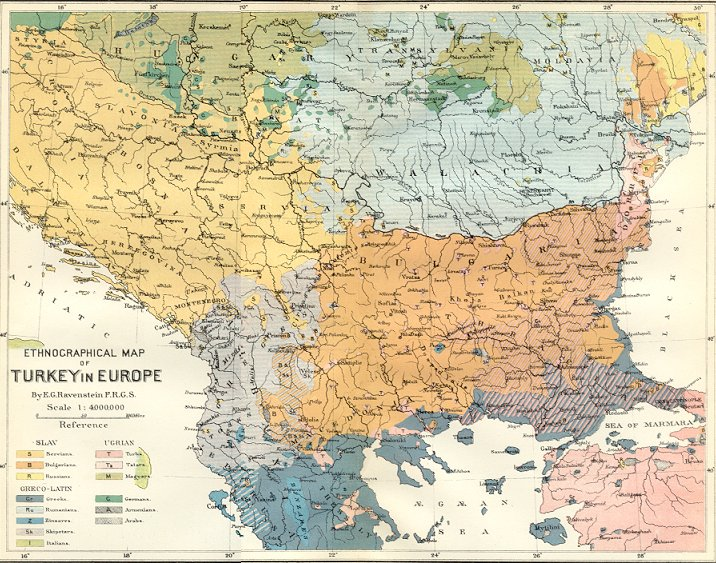
Ethnic composition map of the Balkans by the German-English cartographer E. G. Ravenstein in 1870

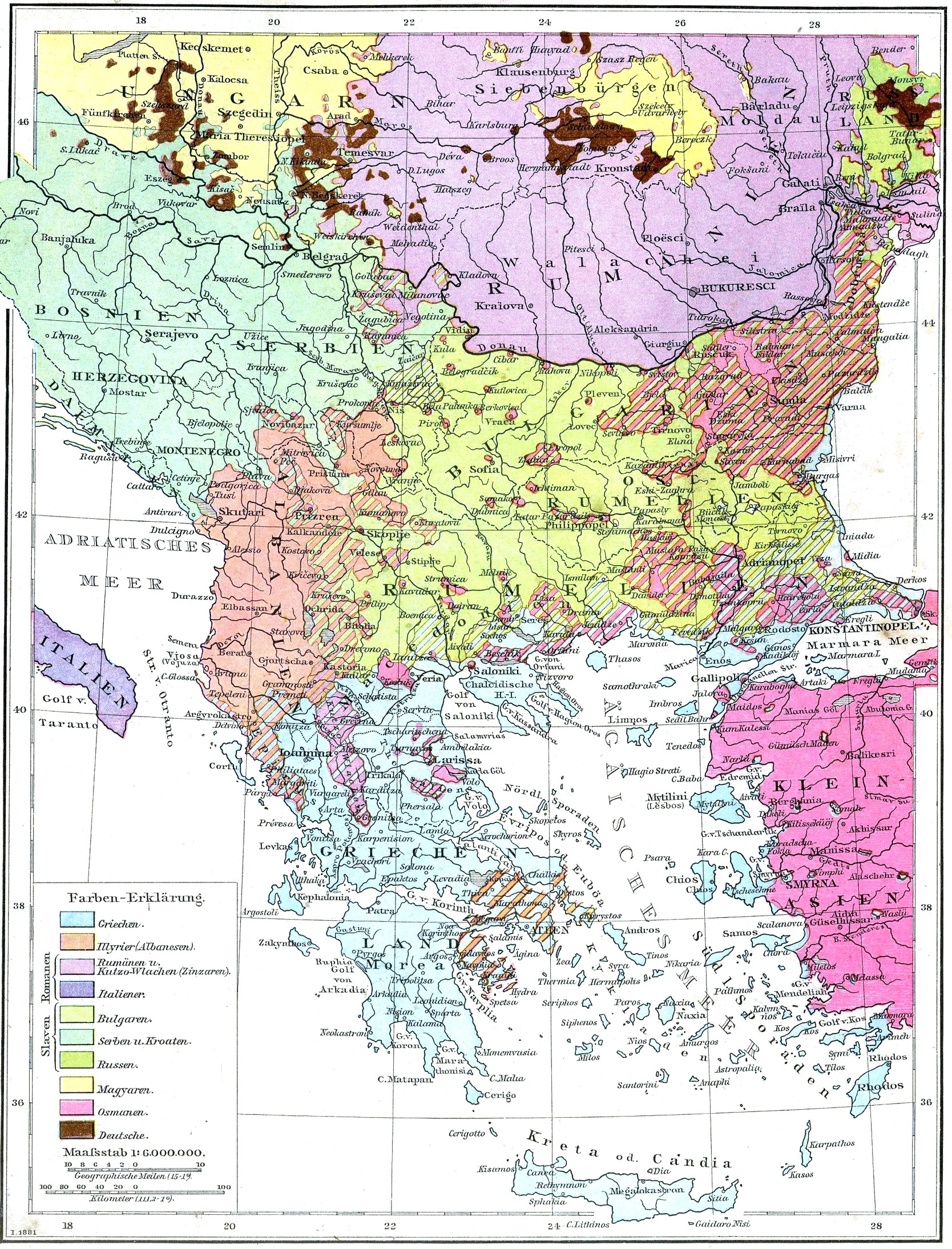
Ethnic composition map of the Balkans from Andrees Allgemeiner Handatlas, 1st Edition, Leipzig 1881

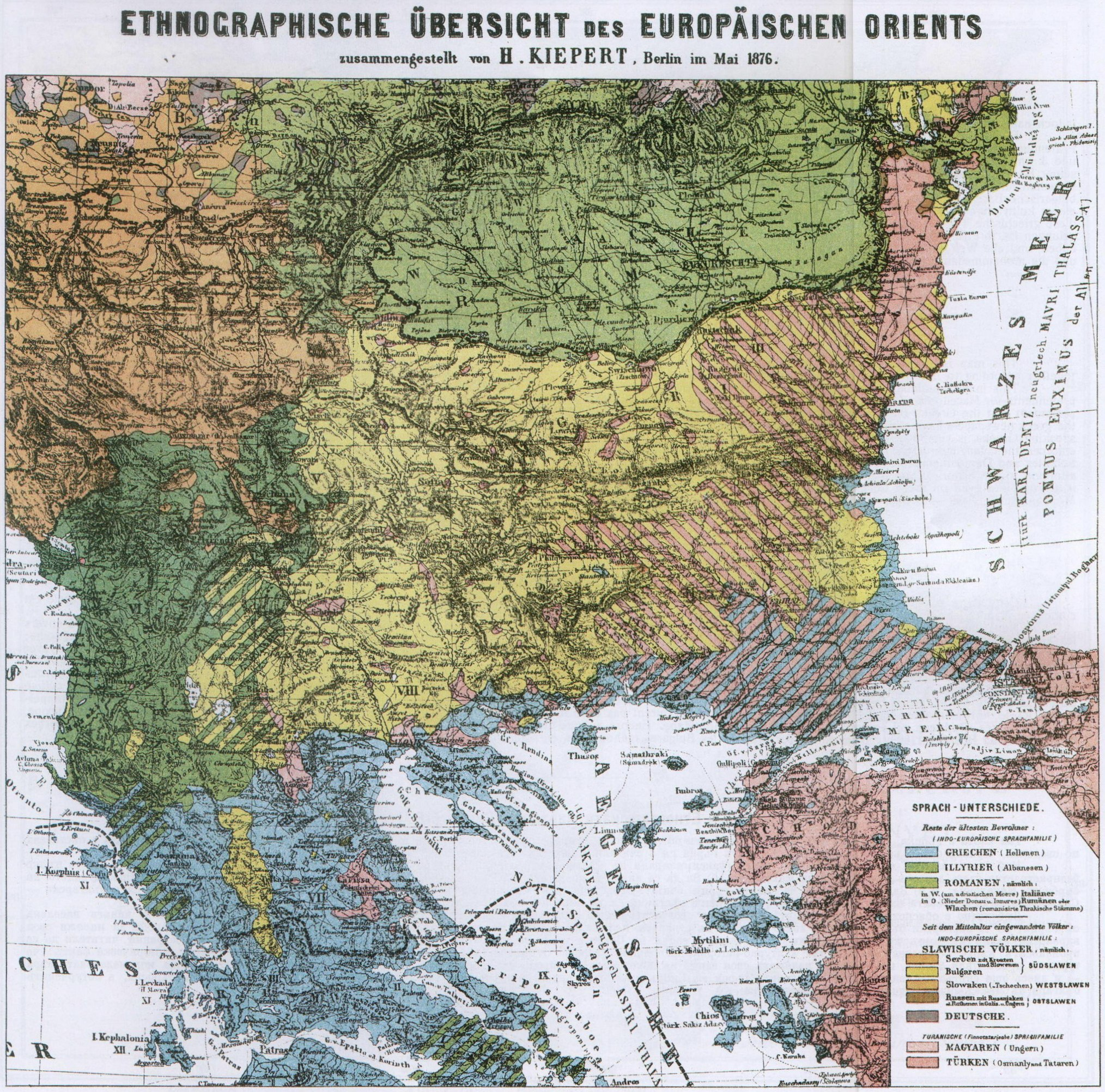
Ethnic composition map of the Balkans by the German geographer and cartographer Heinrich Kiepert in 1882

According to a British report before the 1877–1878 war, the non-Muslim population (consisting mostly of Bulgarians) of Eastern Rumelia was about 60%, a proportion that grew due to the flight and emigration of Muslims during and after the war. The 1878 census show a population of 815,946 people- 573,231 Bulgarians (70.29%), 174,759 Muslims (21.43%), 42,516 Greeks (5.21%), 19,524 Roma, 4,177 Jews, and 1,306 Armenians.

The results of the first Regional Assembly elections of 17 October 1879 show a predominantly Bulgarian character: Of the 36 elected deputies, 31 were Bulgarians (86.1%), 3 were Greeks (8.3%) and two were Turks (5.6%). The ethnic statistics from the censuses of 1880 and 1884 show a Bulgarian majority in the province. In the discredited census of 1880, out of total population of 815,951 people some 590,000 (72.3%) self-identified as Bulgarians, 158,000 (19.4%) as Turks, 19,500 (2.4%) as Roma, and 48,000 (5.9%) belonged to other ethnicities, notably Greeks, Armenians and Jews. The repetition of the census in 1884 returned similar data: 70.0% Bulgarians, 20.6% Turks, 2.8% Roma and 6.7% others.

The Greek inhabitants of Eastern Rumelia were concentrated on the coast, where they were strong in numbers, and certain cities in the interior such as Plovdiv (known in Greek as Philippopolis), where they formed a substantial minority. Most of the Greek population of the region was exchanged with Bulgarians from the Greek provinces of Macedonia and Thrace in the aftermath of the Balkan Wars and World War I.

Eastern Rumelia was also inhabited by foreign nationals, most notably Austrians, Czechs, Hungarians, French people and Italians.

The ethnic composition of the population of Eastern Rumelia, according to the provincial census taken in 1884, was the following:

| Ethnicity (1884 census) | Population | Percentage |
|---|---|---|
| Bulgarians | 681,734 | 70.0% |
| Turks | 200,489 | 20.6% |
| Greeks | 53,028 | 5.4% |
| Roma (Gypsies) | 27,190 | 2.8% |
| Jews | 6,982 | 0.7% |
| Armenians | 1,865 | 0.2% |
| Total | 975,030 | 100% |

The population's ethnic composition in the Bulgarian provinces of Pazardzhik, Plovdiv, Stara Zagora, Haskovo, Sliven, Yambol and Burgas, which have approximately the same territory as Eastern Rumelia (Note: Burgas, Haskovo, and Pazardzhik provinces also include territory that was not part of Eastern Rumelia, while other parts of Eastern Rumelia are now in the provinces of Sofia, Smolyan and Kardzhali. The de facto independent Republic of Tamrash, which is now divided between the provinces of Smolyan and Plovdiv, did not participate in the 1884 census.) according to the 2001 census is the following:

| Ethnicity (2001 census) | Population | Percentage |
|---|---|---|
| Bulgarians | 2,068,787 | 83.7% |
| Turks | 208,530 | 8.4% |
| Roma (Gypsies) | 154,004 | 6.2% |
| Armenians | 5,080 | 0.2% |
| Russians | 4,840 | 0.2% |
| Greeks | 1,398 | 0.1% |
| Jews | 251 | |
| Others | 8,293 | 0.3% |
| Unspecified | 21,540 | 0.9% |
| Total | 2,472,723 | 100% |

== Property rights ==
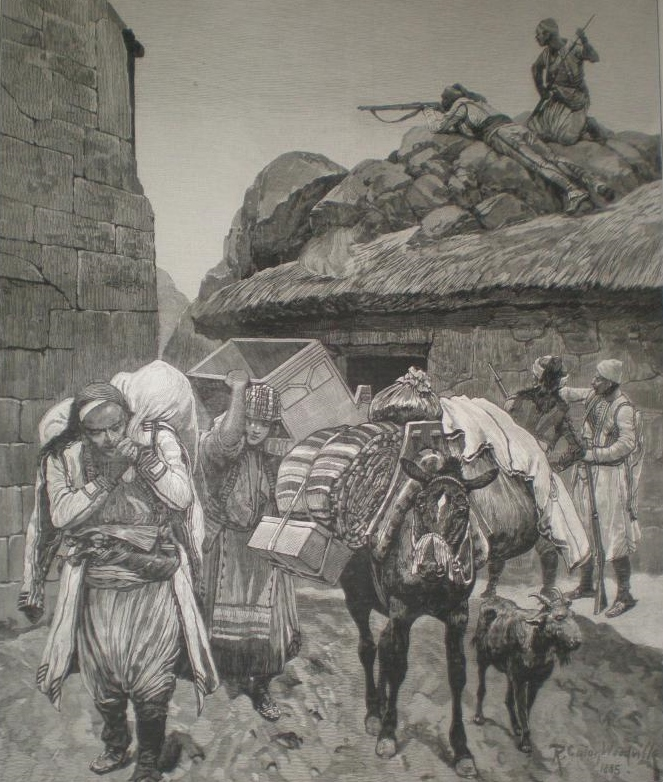
Turkish refugees from Eastern Rumelia, 1885 – The Illustrated London News, author: Richard Caton Woodville, Jr.

Property abandoned by Muslims fleeing the Imperial Russian Army during the 1877–1878 war was appropriated by the local Christian population. The former owners, mostly large landholders, were threatened with trial by military court if they had committed crimes during the war so that they would not return. Two Turkish landowners who did return were in fact sentenced to death thus preventing others from desiring to come back. Those Turkish landowners who were not able to take possession of their land were financially compensated, with the funds collected by the Bulgarian peasants, some of whom were indebted as a result. For those who did return a 10% property tax was issued, forcing many to sell off their property in order to pay the tax. Michael Palairet claimed that land rights of Muslim owners were largely disregarded, despite being guaranteed by the great powers, and the de-Ottomanization of Bulgaria and Eastern Rumelia led to economic decline in the region. Though this is contradicted by many other authors, who show rapid growth of the economy as well as rapid industrial development and growth of exports in Bulgaria after 1878.

== Notes and references ==
=== Sources ===
- Делев, Петър; Валери Кацунов; Пламен Митев; Евгения Калинова; Искра Баева; Боян Добрев (2006). История и цивилизация за 11. клас (in Bulgarian). Труд, Сирма.
