= Eastern question =

Decline of Ottoman Empire and its effect on the balance of power

In diplomatic history, the Eastern question was the issue of the political and economic instability in the Ottoman Empire from the late 18th to early 20th centuries and the subsequent strategic competition and political considerations of the European great powers in light of this. Characterized as the "sick man of Europe", the relative weakening of the empire's military strength in the second half of the nineteenth century threatened to undermine the fragile balance of power system largely shaped by the Concert of Europe. The Eastern question encompassed myriad interrelated elements: Ottoman military defeats, Ottoman institutional insolvency, the ongoing Ottoman political and economic modernization programme, the rise of ethno-religious nationalism in its provinces, and Great Power rivalries. In an attempt to triangulate between these various concerns, the historian Leslie Rogne Schumacher has proposed the following definition of the Eastern Question:

The "Eastern Question" refers to the events and the complex set of dynamics related to Europe's experience of and stake in the decline in political, military and economic power and regional significance of the Ottoman Empire from the latter half of the eighteenth century to the formation of modern Turkey in 1923.

The period in which the Eastern Question was internationally prominent is also open to interpretation. While there is no specific date on which the Eastern question began, the Russo-Turkish War of 1828–1829 brought the issue to the attention of the European powers, Russia and Britain in particular. As the dissolution of the Ottoman Empire was believed to be imminent, the European powers engaged in a power struggle to safeguard their military, strategic and commercial interests in the Ottoman domains. Imperial Russia stood to benefit from the decline of the Ottoman Empire; on the other hand, Austria-Hungary and the United Kingdom deemed the preservation of the Empire to be in their best interests. The Eastern question was put to rest after the First World War, one of the outcomes of which was the collapse and division of Ottoman holdings.

== Background ==
At the height of its power (1683), the Ottoman Empire controlled territory in the Near East and North Africa, as well as Central and Southeastern Europe.

The Eastern question emerged as the power of the Ottoman Empire began to decline during the 18th century. The Ottomans were at the height of their power in 1683, when they lost the Battle of Vienna to the combined forces of the Polish–Lithuanian Commonwealth and Austria, under the command of John III Sobieski. Peace was made much later, in 1699, with the Treaty of Karlowitz, which forced the Ottoman Empire to cede many of its Central European possessions, including those portions of Hungary which it had occupied. Its westward expansion arrested, the Ottoman Empire never again posed a serious threat to Austria, which became the dominant power in its region of Europe. The Eastern question did not truly develop until the Russo-Turkish wars of the 18th century.

According to Karl Marx's writings around the Crimean War, the main factor of the Eastern question was Russian imperialism towards Turkey—with Turkey being a barrier that would protect the rest of Europe, and thus Britain's interests lay with the Ottoman Empire during the Crimean War.

== Napoleonic era ==
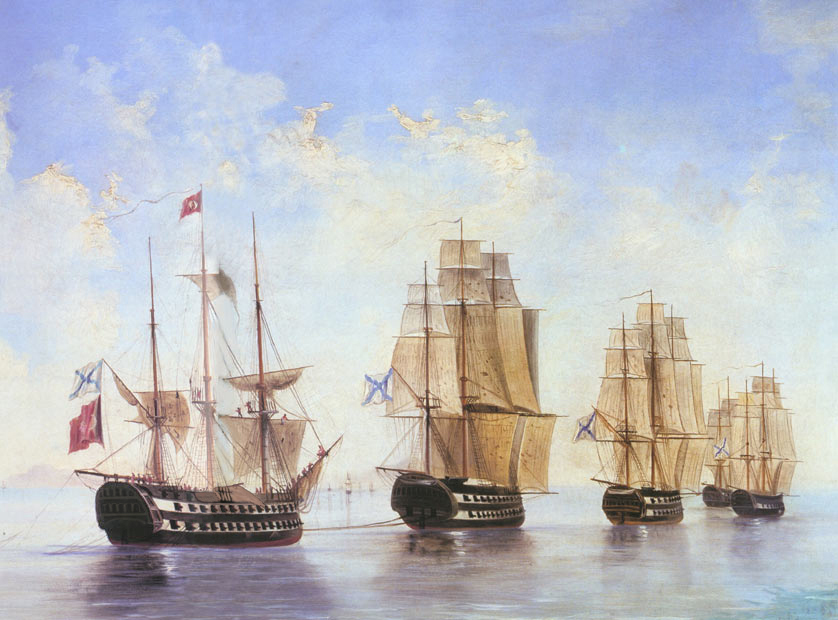
Russian Fleet after the Battle of Athos, by Aleksey Bogolyubov (1824–96)

The Napoleonic era (1799–1815) brought some relief to the faltering Ottoman Empire. It distracted Russia from further advances. Napoleon invaded Egypt but his army was trapped there when the British decisively defeated the French fleet at Aboukir Bay. A peace interlude in 1803 allowed the army to return to France.

To secure his own domination and to render the rest of Europe virtually powerless, Napoleon established an alliance with Russia by concluding the Treaty of Tilsit in 1807. Russia pledged to provide aid to Napoleon in his war against Britain; in turn, the Emperor of Russia would receive the Ottoman territories of Moldavia and Wallachia. If the Sultan refused to surrender these territories, France and Russia were to attack the Empire, and the Ottoman domains in Europe were to be partitioned between the two allies.

The Napoleonic scheme threatened not only the Sultan, but also Britain, Austria and Prussia, which were almost powerless in the face of such a potent alliance. The alliance naturally proved accommodating to the Austrians, who hoped that a joint Franco-Russian attack, which would probably have utterly devastated the Ottoman Empire, could be prevented by diplomacy; but if diplomatic measures failed, the Austrian minister Klemens von Metternich decided that he would support the partition of the Ottoman Empire—a solution disadvantageous to Austria, but not as dangerous as a complete Russian takeover of Southeastern Europe.

An attack on the Empire, however, did not come to pass, and the alliance concluded at Tilsit was dissolved by the French invasion of Russia in 1812. Following Napoleon's defeat by the Great Powers in 1815, representatives of the victors met at the Congress of Vienna, but failed to take any action relating to the territorial integrity of the decaying Ottoman Empire. This omission, together with the exclusion of the Sultan from the Holy Alliance, was interpreted by many as supportive of the position that the Eastern question was a Russian domestic issue that did not concern any other European nations.

== Serbian Revolution ==
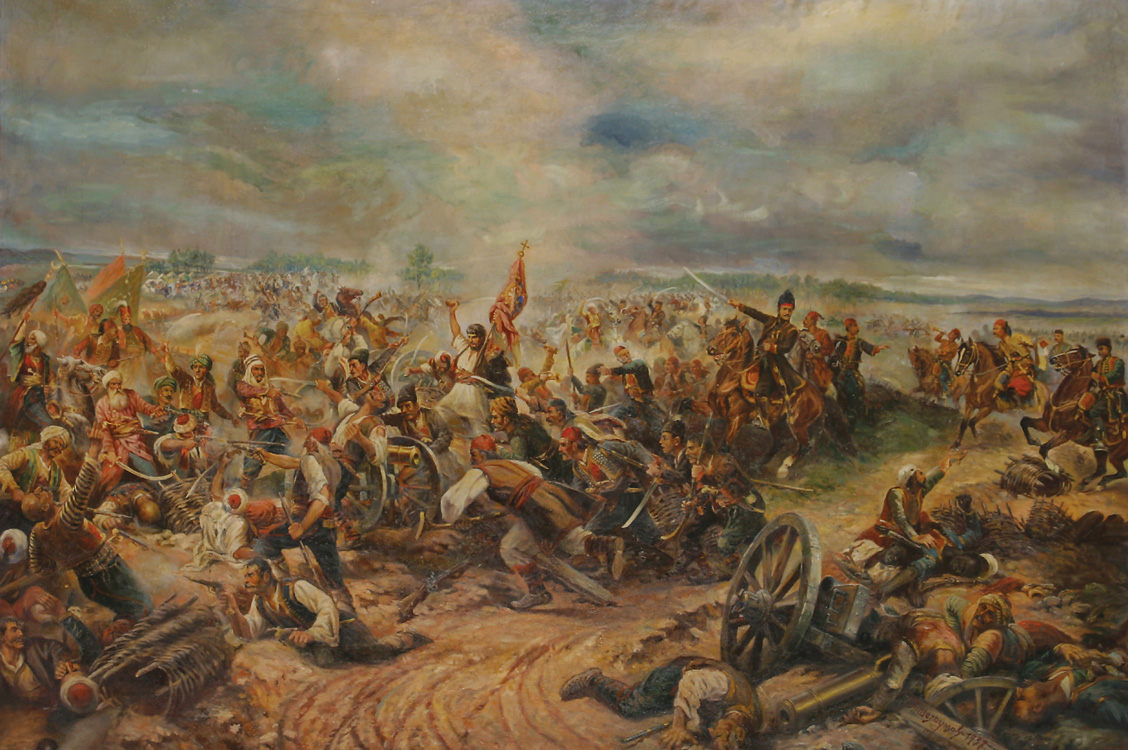
First Serbian Uprising against the Ottoman Empire

The Serbian Revolution or Revolutionary Serbia refers to the national and social revolution of the Serbian people between 1804 and 1815, during which Serbia managed to fully emancipate itself from the Ottoman Empire and exist as a sovereign European nation-state, and a latter period (1815–1833), marked by intense negotiations between Belgrade and the Ottoman Empire. The term was invented by a famous German historian, Leopold von Ranke, in his book Die Serbische Revolution, published in 1829. These events marked the foundation of modern Serbia. While the first phase of the revolution (1804–1815) was in fact a war of independence, the second phase (1815–1833) resulted in official recognition of a suzerain Serbian state by the Porte (the Ottoman government), thus bringing the revolution to its end.

The revolution took place by stages: the First Serbian Uprising (1804–1813), led by Karađorđe Petrović; Hadži-Prodan's rebellion (1814); the Second Serbian Uprising (1815) under Miloš Obrenović; and official recognition of the Serbian state (1815–1833) by the Porte.

The Proclamation (1809) by Karađorđe in the capital Belgrade represented the peak of the revolution. It called for unity of the Serbian nation, emphasizing the importance of freedom of religion, Serbian history and formal, written rules of law, all of which it claimed the Ottoman Empire had failed to provide. It also called on Serbs to stop paying the jizya tax to the Porte.

The ultimate result of the uprisings was Serbia's suzerainty from the Ottoman Empire. The Principality of Serbia was established, governed by its own parliament, government, constitution and its own royal dynasty. Social element of the revolution was achieved through introduction of the bourgeois society values in Serbia, which is why it was considered the world's easternmost bourgeois revolt, which culminated with the abolition of feudalism in 1806. The establishment of the first constitution in the Balkans in 1835 (later abolished) and the founding in 1808 of its first university, Belgrade's Great Academy, added to the achievements of the young Serb state. By 1833, Serbia was officially recognized as a tributary to the Ottoman Empire and as such, acknowledged as a hereditary monarchy. Full independence of the Principality was internationally recognized during the second half of the 19th century.

== Greek War of Independence ==
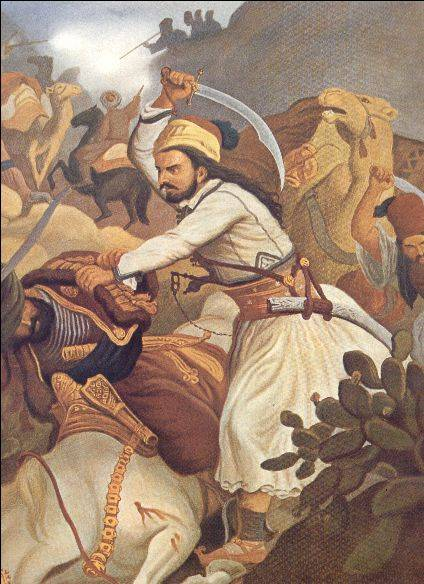
The Battle of Vassilika in 1821 marked an early turning point in the war.

The Eastern question once again became a major European issue when the Greeks declared independence from the Sultan in 1821. It was at about this time that the phrase "Eastern question" was coined. Ever since the defeat of Napoleon in 1815, there had been rumours that the Emperor of Russia sought to invade the Ottoman Empire, and the Greek Revolt seemed to make an invasion even more likely. The British foreign minister, Robert Stewart, Viscount Castlereagh, as well as the Austrian foreign minister, Metternich, counselled the Emperor of Russia, Alexander I, not to enter the war. Instead, they pleaded that he maintain the Concert of Europe (the spirit of broad collaboration in Europe which had persisted since Napoleon's defeat). A desire for peaceful co-operation was also held by Alexander I, who had founded the Holy Alliance. Rather than immediately putting the Eastern question to rest by aiding the Greeks and attacking the Ottomans, Alexander wavered, ultimately failing to take any decisive action.

Alexander's death in 1825 brought Nicholas I to the Imperial Throne of Russia. Deciding that he would no longer tolerate negotiations and conferences, he chose to intervene in Greece. Britain also soon became involved, with its intervention motivated in part by the desire to prevent the young Greek state from becoming a wholly Russian vassal. The spirit of romanticism that then dominated Western European cultural life also made support for Greek independence politically viable. France too aligned itself with the Greeks, but Austria (still worried about Russian expansion) did not. Outraged by the interference of the Great Powers, the Ottoman Sultan, Mahmud II, denounced Russia as an enemy of Islam, prompting Russia to declare war in 1828. An alarmed Austria sought to form an anti-Russian coalition, but its attempts were in vain.

As the war continued into 1829, Russia gained a firm advantage over the Ottoman Empire. By prolonging hostilities further, however, Russia would have invited Austria to enter the war against her and would have resulted in considerable suspicion in Britain. Therefore, for the Russians to continue with the war in hopes of destroying the Ottoman Empire would have been inexpedient. At this stage, the King of France, Charles X, proposed the partition of the Ottoman Empire among Austria, Russia and others, but his scheme was presented too belatedly to produce a result.

Thus, Russia was able to secure neither a decisive defeat nor a partition of the Ottoman Empire. It chose, however, to adopt the policy of degrading the Ottoman Empire to a mere dependency. In 1829, the Emperor of Russia concluded the Treaty of Adrianople with the Sultan; his empire was granted additional territory along the Black Sea, Russian commercial vessels were granted access to the Dardanelles, and the commercial rights of Russians in the Ottoman Empire were enhanced. The Greek War of Independence was terminated shortly thereafter, as Greece was granted independence by the Treaty of Constantinople in 1832.

== Muhammad Ali of Egypt ==
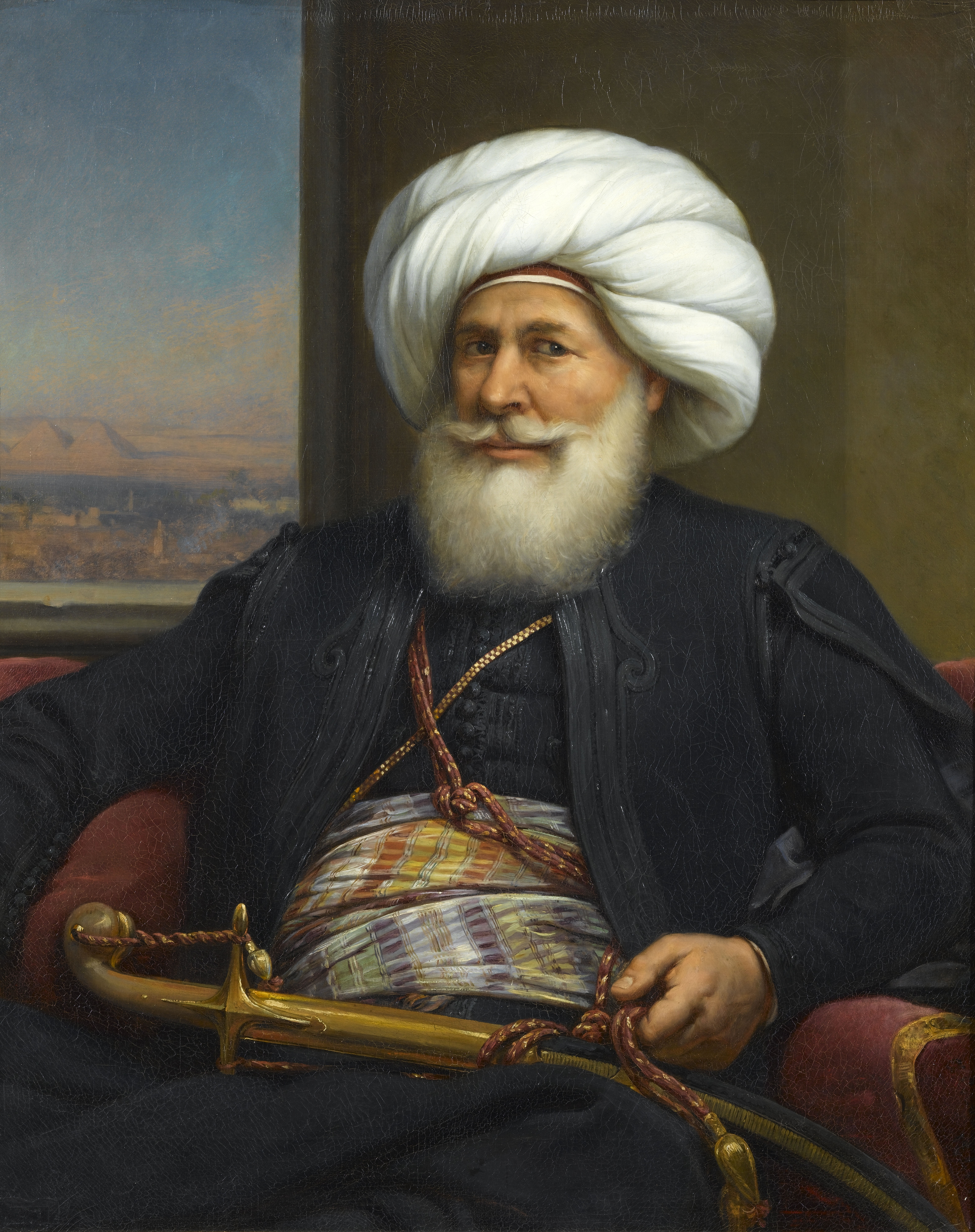
Muhammad Ali Pasha

Just as the Greek Revolt was coming to an end, the Egyptian–Ottoman War (1831–1833) broke out in the Ottoman Empire between the Sultan and his nominal viceroy in Egypt, Muhammad Ali. The modern and well trained Egyptians looked as though they could conquer the empire. The Tsar of Russia, in keeping with his policy of reducing the Ottoman Sultan to a petty vassal, offered to form an alliance with the Sultan. In 1833, the two rulers negotiated the Treaty of Unkiar Skelessi, in which Russia secured complete dominance over the Ottomans. The Russians pledged to protect the Empire from external attacks; in turn, the Sultan pledged to close the Dardanelles to warships whenever Russia was at war. This provision of the Treaty raised a problem known as the "Straits question". The agreement provided for the closure for all warships, but many European statesmen mistakenly believed that the clause allowed Russian vessels. Britain and France were angered by the misinterpreted clause; they also sought to contain Russian expansionism. The two kingdoms, however, differed on how to achieve their objective; the British wished to uphold the Sultan, but the French preferred to make Muhammad Ali (whom they saw as more competent) the ruler of the entire Ottoman Empire. Russian intervention led the Sultan to negotiate a peace with Muhammad Ali in 1833, but a second Egyptian–Ottoman War broke out in 1839.

Sultan Mahmud II died the same year, leaving the Ottoman Empire to his son Abdulmejid I in a critical state: the Ottoman army had been significantly defeated by the forces of Muhammad Ali. Another disaster followed when the entire Turkish fleet was seized by the Egyptian forces. Great Britain and Russia now intervened to prevent the collapse of the Ottoman Empire, but France still continued to support Muhammad Ali. In 1840, however, the Great Powers agreed to compromise; Muhammad Ali agreed to make a nominal act of submission to the Sultan, but was granted hereditary control of Egypt.

The only unresolved issue of the period was the Straits question. In 1841, Russia consented to the abrogation of the Treaty of Unkiar Skelessi by accepting the London Straits Convention. The Great Powers — Russia, Britain, France, Austria and Prussia — agreed to the re-establishment of the "ancient rule" of the Ottoman Empire, which provided that the Turkish straits would be closed to all warships whatsoever, with the exception of the Sultan's allies during wartime. With the Straits Convention, the Russian Emperor Nicholas I abandoned the idea of reducing the Sultan to a state of dependence, and returned to the plan of partitioning Ottoman territories in Europe.

Thus, after the resolution of the Egyptian struggle which had begun in 1831, the weak Ottoman Empire was no longer wholly dependent on Russia but was dependent on the Great Powers for protection. Attempts at internal reform failed to end the decline of the Empire. By the 1840s, the Ottoman Empire had become the "sick man of Europe", and its eventual dissolution appeared inevitable.

== Revolutions of 1848 ==
After the Great Powers reached a compromise to end the revolt of Mehmet Ali, the Eastern question lay dormant for about a decade until revived by the Revolutions of 1848. Although Russia could have seized the opportunity to attack the Ottoman Empire—France and Austria were at the time occupied by their own insurrections—it chose not to. Instead, Emperor Nicholas committed his troops to the defence of Austria, hoping to establish goodwill to allow him to seize Ottoman possessions in Europe later.

After the Austrian Revolution was suppressed, an Austro-Russian war against the Ottoman Empire seemed imminent. The Emperors of both Austria and Russia demanded that the Sultan return Austrian rebels who had sought asylum in the Empire, but he refused. The indignant monarchs withdrew their ambassadors to the Sublime Porte, threatening armed conflict. Almost immediately, however, Britain and France sent their fleets to protect the Ottoman Empire. The two Emperors, deeming military hostilities futile, withdrew their demands for the surrender of the fugitives. The short crisis created a closer relationship between Britain and France, which led to a joint war against Russia in the Crimean War of 1853–56.

== Crimean War ==
A new conflict began during the 1850s with a religious dispute. Under treaties negotiated during the 18th century, France was the guardian of Roman Catholics in the Ottoman Empire, while Russia was the protector of Orthodox Christians. For several years, however, Catholic and Orthodox monks had disputed possession of the Church of the Nativity and the Church of the Holy Sepulchre in Palestine. During the early 1850s, the two sides made demands which the Sultan could not possibly satisfy simultaneously. In 1853, the Sultan adjudicated in favour of the French, despite the vehement protestations of the local Orthodox monks.

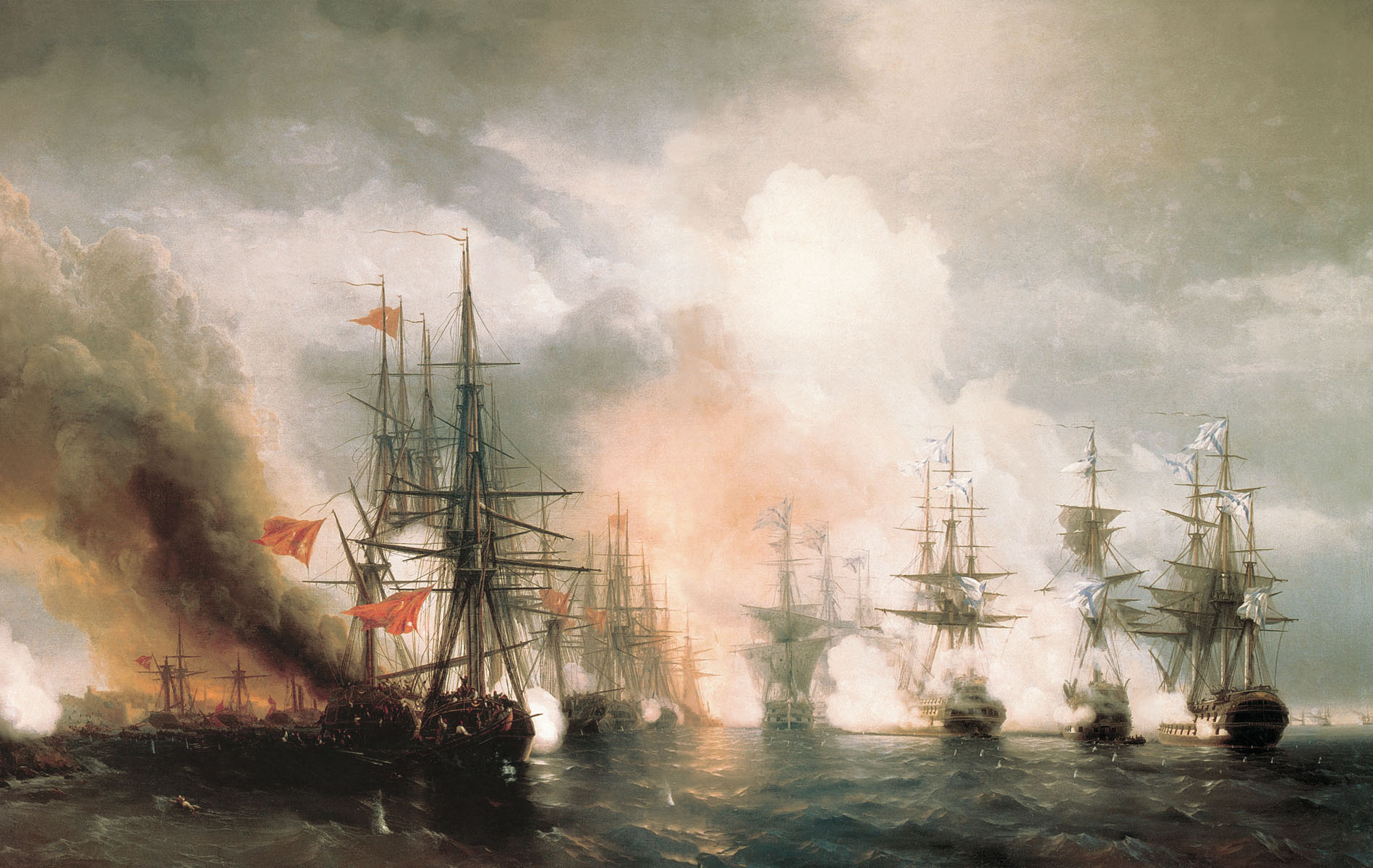
The Russian destruction of the Turkish fleet at the Battle of Sinop on 30 November 1853

Emperor Nicholas of Russia dispatched Prince Menshikov on a special mission to the Porte. By previous treaties, the Sultan was committed "to protect the Christian religion and its Churches", but Menshikov tried to negotiate a new treaty, under which Russia would be allowed to interfere whenever it deemed the Sultan's protection inadequate. At the same time, however, the British government sent Lord Stratford, who learnt of Menshikov's demands upon arriving. Through skillful diplomacy, Lord Stratford convinced the Sultan to reject the treaty, which compromised the independence of the Ottomans. Shortly after he learned of the failure of Menshikov's diplomacy, Nicholas marched into Moldavia and Wallachia (Ottoman principalities in which Russia was acknowledged as a special guardian of the Orthodox Church), with the pretext that the Sultan failed to resolve the issue of the Holy Places. Nicholas believed that the European powers would not object strongly to the annexation of a few neighbouring Ottoman provinces, especially given Russian involvement in suppressing the Revolutions of 1848.

Britain, seeking to maintain the security of the Ottoman Empire, sent a fleet to the Dardanelles, where it was joined by another fleet sent by France. Yet the European powers hoped for a diplomatic compromise. The representatives of the four neutral Great Powers—Britain, France, Austria and Prussia—met in Vienna, where they drafted a note which they hoped would be acceptable to both the Russians and the Ottomans. The note was approved by Nicolas but rejected by Sultan Abd-ul-Mejid I, who felt that the document's poor phrasing left it open to many interpretations. Britain, France and Austria were united in proposing amendments to mollify the Sultan, but their suggestions were ignored in the Court of Saint Petersburg. Britain and France set aside the idea of continuing negotiations, but Austria and Prussia held hope for diplomacy despite the rejection of the proposed amendments. The Sultan proceeded to war, his armies attacking the Russian army near the Danube. Nicholas responded by despatching warships, which destroyed the entire Ottoman fleet at Sinop on 30 November 1853, allowing Russia to land and supply its forces on the Ottoman shores fairly easily. The destruction of the Ottoman fleet and the threat of Russian expansion alarmed both Britain and France, who stepped forth in defence of the Ottoman Empire. In 1854, after Russia ignored an Anglo-French ultimatum to withdraw from the Danubian Principalities, Britain and France declared war.

France takes Algeria from Turkey, and almost every year England annexes another Indian principality: none of this disturbs the balance of power; but when Russia occupies Moldavia and Wallachia, albeit only temporarily, that disturbs the balance of power. France occupies Rome and stays there several years during peacetime: that is nothing; but Russia only thinks of occupying Constantinople, and the peace of Europe is threatened. The English declare war on the Chinese, who have, it seems, offended them: no one has the right to intervene; but Russia is obliged to ask Europe for permission if it quarrels with its neighbor. England threatens Greece to support the false claims of a miserable Jew and burns its fleet: that is a lawful action; but Russia demands a treaty to protect millions of Christians, and that is deemed to strengthen its position in the East at the expense of the balance of power. We can expect nothing from the West but blind hatred and malice... (comment in the margin by Nicholas I: 'This is the whole point').

— Mikhail Pogodin's memorandum to Nicholas I

Among those who supported the Franco-English point of view was Karl Marx, in his articles for the New York Tribune circa 1853. Karl Marx saw the Crimean War as a conflict between the democratic ideals of the west that started with "great movement of 1789" against "Russia and Absolutism". Marx saw the Ottoman Empire as a buffer against a pattern of expansionism by the Tsar.

Emperor Nicholas I presumed that Austria, in return for the support rendered during the Revolutions of 1848, would side with him, or at the very least remain neutral. However, Austria felt threatened by the Russian troops in the nearby Danubian Principalities. When Britain and France demanded the withdrawal of Russian forces from the Principalities, Austria supported them; and, though it did not immediately declare war on Russia, it refused to guarantee its neutrality. When, in the summer of 1854, Austria made another demand for the withdrawal of troops, Russia (fearing that Austria would enter the war) complied.

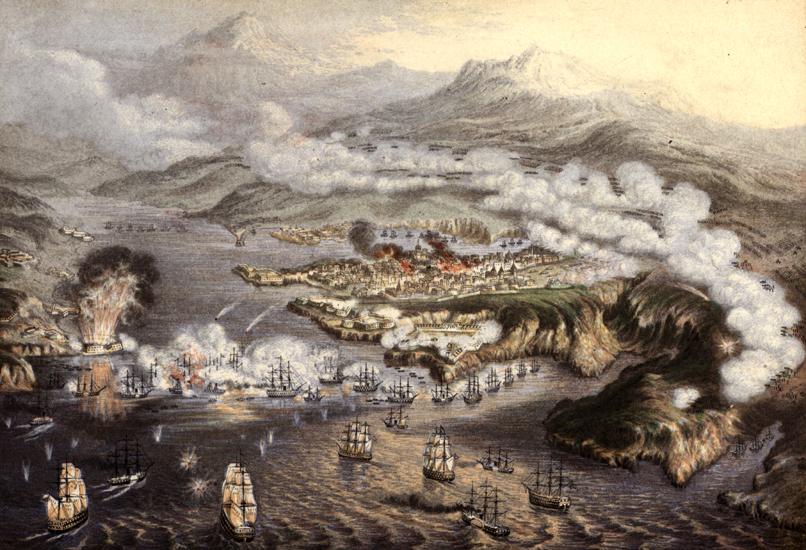
The eleven-month siege of a Russian naval base at Sevastopol

Though the original grounds for war were lost when Russia withdrew her troops from the Danubian Principalities, Britain and France continued hostilities. Determined to address the Eastern question by ending the Russian threat to the Ottoman Empire, the allies posed several conditions for a ceasefire, including that Russia should give up its protectorate over the Danubian Principalities; that Russia should abandon any right to interfere in Ottoman affairs on the behalf of Orthodox Christians; that the Straits Convention of 1841 was to be revised; and finally, all nations were to be granted access to the river Danube. As the Emperor refused to comply with these "Four Points", the Crimean War proceeded.

Peace negotiations began in 1856 under the Emperor Nicholas I's successor, Alexander II. Under the ensuing Treaty of Paris, the "Four Points" plan proposed earlier was largely adhered to; most notably, Russia's special privileges relating to the Danubian Principalities were transferred to the Great Powers as a group. In addition, warships of all nations were perpetually excluded from the Black Sea, once the home to a Russian fleet (which had been destroyed during the war). The Emperor of Russia and the Sultan agreed not to establish any naval or military arsenal on that sea coast. The Black Sea clauses came at a tremendous disadvantage to Russia, for it greatly diminished the naval threat it posed to the Ottomans. Moreover, all the Great Powers pledged to respect the independence and territorial integrity of the Ottoman Empire.

The Treaty of Paris stood until 1871, when France was crushed in the Franco-Prussian War. While Prussia and several other German states united into a powerful German Empire, Napoleon III was deposed in the formation of the French Third Republic. Napoleon had opposed Russia over the Eastern question in order to gain the support of Britain. But the new French Republic did not oppose Russian interference in the Ottoman Empire because that did not significantly threaten French interests. Encouraged by the decision of France, and supported by the German minister Otto von Bismarck, Russia denounced the Black Sea clauses of the treaty agreed to in 1856. As Britain alone could not enforce the clauses, Russia once again established a fleet in the Black Sea.

== Great Eastern Crisis (1875–1878) ==
In 1875 the territory of Herzegovina rebelled against the Ottoman Sultan in the province of Bosnia; soon after, Bulgaria rebelled as well. The Great Powers believed they should intervene to prevent a bloody war in the Balkans. The first to act were the members of the League of the Three Emperors (Germany, Austria-Hungary and Russia), whose common attitude toward the Eastern Question was embodied in the Andrassy Note of 30 December 1875 (named for the Hungarian diplomat Julius, Count Andrassy). The note, seeking to avoid a widespread conflagration in Southeastern Europe, urged the Sultan to institute various reforms, including granting religious liberty to Christians. A joint commission of Christians and Muslims was to be established to ensure the enactment of appropriate reforms. With the approval of Britain and France, the note was submitted to the Sultan, and he agreed on 31 January 1876. But the Herzegovinian leaders rejected the proposal, pointing out that the Sultan had already failed in his promises of reforms.

Representatives of the Three Emperors met again in Berlin, where they approved the Berlin Memorandum (May 1876). To convince the Herzegovinians, the memorandum suggested that international representatives be allowed to oversee the institution of reforms in the rebelling provinces. But before the memorandum could be approved by the Porte, the Ottoman Empire was convulsed by internal strife, which led to the deposition of Sultan Abdul-Aziz (30 May 1876). The new Sultan, Murad V, was himself deposed three months later due to his mental instability, and Sultan Abdul Hamid II came to power (31 August 1876). In the meantime, the hardships of the Ottomans had increased; their treasury was empty, and they faced insurrections not only in Herzegovina and Bulgaria, but also in Serbia and Montenegro. Still, the Ottoman Empire managed to crush the insurgents in August 1876. The result inconvenienced Russia, which had planned to take possession of various Ottoman territories in Southeastern Europe in the course of the conflict.

After the uprisings were largely suppressed, however, rumours of Ottoman atrocities against the rebellious population shocked European sensibilities. Russia now intended to enter the conflict on the side of the rebels. Delegates of the Great Powers (who now numbered six due to the rise of Italy) assembled at the Constantinople Conference (23 December 1876 to 20 January 1877) to make another attempt for peace. However, the Sultan refused the December 1876 proposals to allow international representatives to oversee the reforms in Bosnia and Herzegovina. In 1877 the Great Powers again made proposals to the Ottoman Empire, which the Porte rejected (18 January 1877).

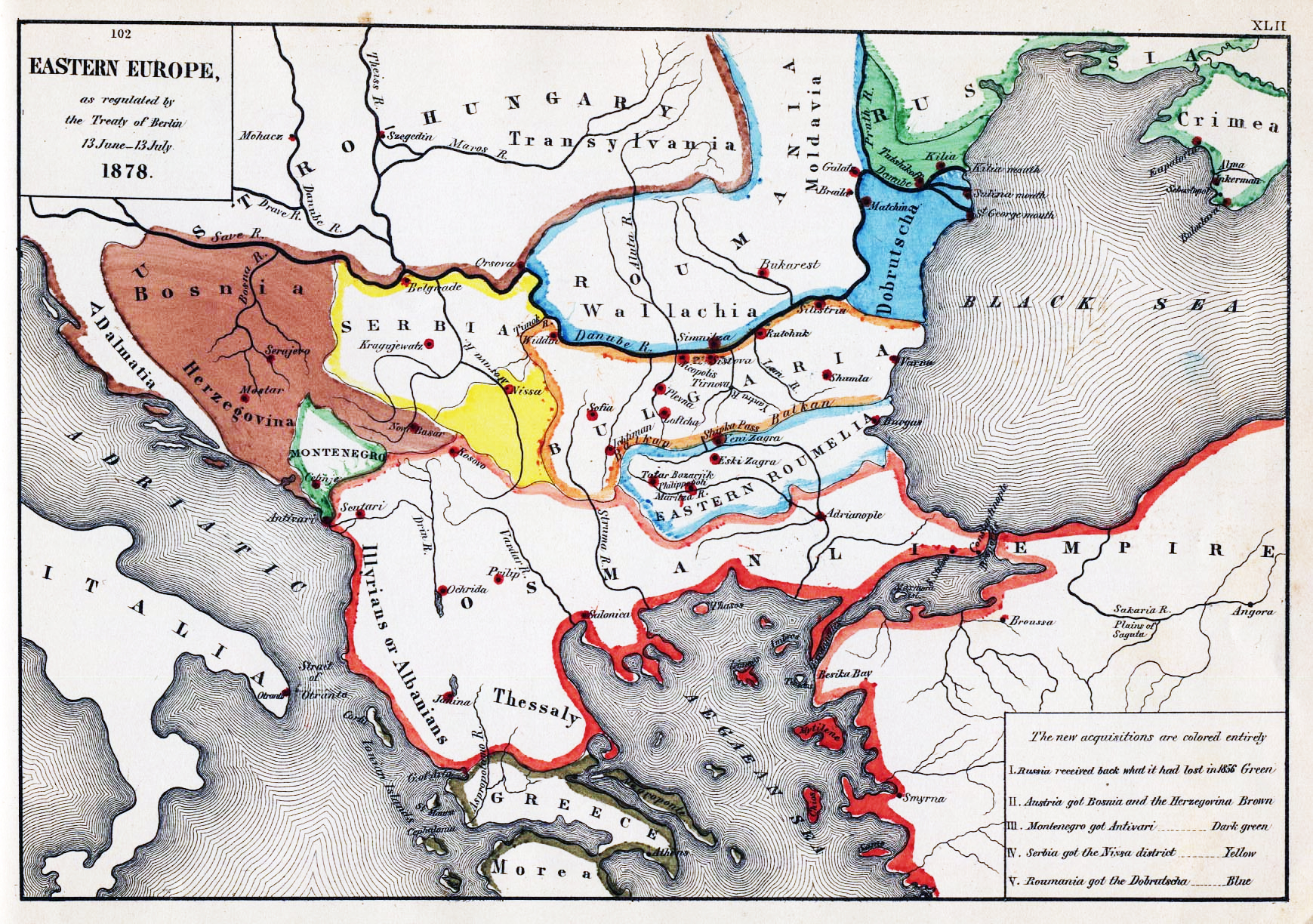
South-East Europe after the Congress of Berlin, 1878

Russia declared war against the Ottoman Empire on 24 April 1877. The Russian chancellor Prince Gorchakov had effectively secured Austrian neutrality with the Reichstadt Agreement of July 1876, under which Ottoman territories captured in the course of the war would be partitioned between the Russian and Austria-Hungarian Empires, with the latter obtaining Bosnia and Herzegovina. Britain, though acutely aware of the Russian threat to its colonies in India, did not involve itself in the conflict. However, when Russia threatened to conquer Constantinople, British Prime Minister Benjamin Disraeli urged Austria and Germany to ally with him against this war-aim. Russia negotiated peace through the Treaty of San Stefano (3 March 1878), which stipulated independence to Romania, Serbia, and Montenegro, autonomy to Bulgaria, reforms in Bosnia and Herzegovina; the ceding Dobruja and parts of Armenia and a large indemnity to Russia. This would give Russia great influence in Southeastern Europe, as it could dominate the newly independent states. To reduce these advantages to Russia, the Great Powers (especially Britain), insisted on a thorough revision of the Treaty of San Stefano.

At the Congress of Berlin, the Treaty of Berlin of 13 July 1878 adjusted the boundaries of the new states in the Ottoman Empire's favour. Bulgaria was divided into two states (Bulgaria and Eastern Rumelia), as it was feared that a single state would be susceptible to Russian domination. Ottoman cessions to Russia were largely sustained. Bosnia and Herzegovina, though still nominally within the Ottoman Empire, were transferred to Austrian control. A secret agreement between Britain and the Ottoman Empire transferred the Ottoman island of Cyprus to Britain. These final two procedures were predominantly negotiated by Disraeli, whom Otto von Bismarck famously described as "The old Jew, that is the man", after his level-headed Palmerstonian approach to the Eastern question.

== Germany and the Ottoman Empire ==
Germany drew away from Russia and became closer to Austria-Hungary, with whom it concluded the Dual Alliance in 1879. Germany also closely allied with the Ottoman Empire. The German government took over the re-organisation of the Ottoman military and financial system; in return, it received several commercial concessions, including permission to build the Baghdad Railway, which secured for them access to several important economic markets and opened the potential for German entry into the Persian Gulf area, then controlled by Britain. German interest was driven not only by commercial interests, but also by a burgeoning rivalry with Britain and France. Meanwhile, Britain agreed to the Entente Cordiale with France in 1904, thereby resolving differences between the two countries over international affairs. Britain also reconciled with Russia in 1907 with the Anglo-Russian Entente.

For the German historian Leopold von Ranke Christianity was morally most superior and could not be improved upon. When Ranke wrote Zur orientalischen Frage. Gutachten at the behest of the kaiser he framed the Eastern Question as primarily religious in nature; the civil rights of Christians against Muslims in the Ottoman Empire could only be secured by the intervention of the Christian European nations. He was considered a leading authority in the field of Orientalism in his time.

== Young Turk Revolution ==
In April 1908, the Committee of Union and Progress (more commonly called the Young Turks), a political party opposed to the despotic rule of Sultan Abdul Hamid II, led a rebellion against the Sultan. The pro-reform Young Turks deposed the Sultan by July 1909, replacing him with the ineffective Mehmed V. This began the Second Constitutional Era of the Ottoman Empire.

In the following years, various constitutional and political reforms were instituted, but the decay of the Ottoman Empire continued.

== Bosnian Crisis ==
As the Young Turks took charge of the government in the Ottoman Empire, the Austrians feared they might regain control of Bosnia and Herzegovina – which was under the de facto rule of Austria-Hungary under the Treaty of Berlin, but the provinces officially remained possessions of the Ottoman Empire. The Austrian foreign minister Graf Lexa von Aehrenthal resolved to annex the territory, which was both economically and strategically important. Russia was contacted by Aehrenthal. Izvolsky agreed that Russia would not object to the annexation. In return, Austria would not object to opening the Bosphorus and Dardanelles Straits to Russian warships, an advantage that had been denied to Russia since 1841. On October 7, 1908, Austria-Hungary annexed Bosnia and Herzegovina. The Serbians were outraged. However, Germany was allied with Austria, leaving Serbia helpless against two great powers. Although the conflict was resolved without any immediate warfare, the result embittered relations between Serbia and Austria-Hungary. Russia's resentment at having been deceived and humiliated contributed to the outbreak of World War I.

== Timeline ==
- 1683–99 – Great Turkish War and Polish–Ottoman War (1683–1699); the Holy League decisively defeated the Ottomans, bringing an end to its expansionism.
- 1684–99 – Morean War.
- 1686–1700 - Russo-Turkish War.
- 1699 – Treaty of Karlowitz; the Ottomans ceded much of Hungary, Croatia, Slavonia and the Principality of Transylvania to the Habsburgs. Poland–Lithuania gained Podolia, and Venice gained Morea and inner Dalmatia.
- 1700 - Treaty of Constantinople (peace treaty of the Russo-Turkish War of 1686–1700); the Ottomans ceded Azov, the Taganrog fortress, Pavlovsk and Mius to Russia.
- 1710–11 – Pruth River Campaign.
- 1711 – Treaty of the Pruth (peace treaty of the Russo-Turkish War of 1710–11); the Russians had to return the Azov Fortress to the Ottomans, Taganrog and several Russian fortresses were to be demolished.
- 1713 – Treaty of Adrianople.
- 1714–18 – Ottoman–Venetian War.
- 1716–18 – Austro–Turkish War.
- 1718 – Treaty of Passarowitz with Austria and Venice; major Turkish losses.
- 1730–35 – Ottoman–Iranian War. Turks lose much of Caucasus.
- 1735–39 – Austro-Russian–Turkish War; stalemate.
- 1739 - Treaty of Belgrade; the Habsburgs lost Wallachia Minor (Oltenia), central Serbia with Belgrade, and the Bosnian section of Posavina.
- 1739 – Treaty of Niš (peace treaty of the Russo-Turkish War of 1735–39); the Russians were allowed to build a port at Azov, though without fortifications and without the right to have a fleet in the Black Sea.
- 1763–1864 – Russo-Circassian War; Russian annexation of Circassia, resulting in the Circassian genocide.
- 1768–1774 – Russo-Turkish War; Russia gains control of southern Ukraine, Crimea, and the upper northwestern part of the North Caucasus.
- 1774 – Treaty of Küçük Kaynarca (peace treaty of the Russo-Turkish War of 1768–74); Russia gained the right to construct a Greek Orthodox Church in Istanbul, claiming itself to be the protector of the Greek Orthodox in the Ottoman Empire.
- 1780–1792 – Greek Plan; the Russian empress Catherine the Great proposed a solution to the Eastern question: the partition of the Ottoman Empire between the Russian and Habsburg Empires followed by the restoration of the Byzantine Empire centered in Constantinople.
- 1783 – Annexation of the Crimean Khanate by the Russian Empire.
- 1787–1792 – Russo-Turkish War.
- 1788–1791 – Austro-Turkish War; Turkish loss.
- 1789–1799 – French Revolution. Ottoman Empire is generally neutral.
- 1791 – Treaty of Sistova. Peace treaty of the Austro–Turkish War (1787–1791). Ottoman-Habsburg wars ended.
- 1792 – Treaty of Jassy (peace treaty of the Russo-Turkish War of 1787–92).
- 1795 – Treaty of Algiers. The US government pays tax to the Ottoman Empire for safe trade in the Mediterranean.
- 1796 – Persian expedition; Catherine II directed the army to Transcaucasia under the command of General Zubov. Baku falls.
- 1798–1802 – Napoleon invasion of Egypt and Syria.
- 1801–05 – First Barbary War.
- 1804–13 – First Serbian Uprising.
- 1804–13 – Russo-Persian War.
- 1806–12 – Russo-Turkish War.
- 1807–09 – Anglo-Turkish War.
- 1809 – Treaty of the Dardanelles (peace treaty of the Anglo-Turkish War of 1807–09).
- 1812 – Treaty of Bucharest (peace treaty of the Russo-Turkish War of 1807–12).
- 1813 – Treaty of Gulistan (peace treaty of the Russo-Persian War of 1804); Iran gives up Dagestan, eastern Georgia, northern Armenia and the majority of Azerbaijan to Russia.
- 1815–17 – Second Serbian Uprising.
- 1815 – Second Barbary War.
- 1817–64 – Caucasian War; North Caucasus annexed by Russia.
- 1821 – Wallachian uprising, suppressed by the Ottomans.
- 1821–29 – Greek War of Independence; Greek victory.
- 1821 – Constantinople massacre against the Greek community by the Ottomans.
- 1822 – Chios massacre.
- 1823–25 – Greek civil wars.
- 1824 – Destruction of Psara.
- 1826 – Protocol of St. Petersburg; Britain and Russia agreed to impose mediation on the Greek War of Independence, granting the Greeks a limited independence and willing to use force if their offer was rejected.
- 1826–28 – Ottoman–Egyptian invasion of Mani.
- 1826–28 – Russo-Persian War.
- 1827 – Treaty of London; the Great Powers agreed to create an independent Greece but tributary to the Ottomans, with the Sultan as its supreme ruler. The Ottomans rejected the treaty, resulting in the Allied military intervention.
- 1827 – Battle of Navarino; Britain, France, and Russia decisively defeated the combined Ottoman–Egyptian fleet.
- 1828 – Treaty of Turkmenchay.
- 1828–29 – Russo-Turkish War.
- 1828–33 – Morea expedition; the French Army intervenes in the Peloponnese.
- 1829 – Treaty of Adrianople; Greece gains autonomy.
- 1830 – London Protocol; the Great Powers recognized Greece as a fully sovereign and independent state, separate from the Ottoman Empire.
- 1830 – Invasion of Algiers; the Kingdom of France, ruled by Charles X, invaded and conquered the Regency of Algiers.
- 1831 – Muhammad Ali of Syria, invasion of Anatolia, First Egyptian-Turkish War (~ 1833). Bosnian uprising.
- 1832 – London Conference; the Great Powers established the Kingdom of Greece under a Bavarian prince.
- 1832 – Treaty of Constantinople; the Great Powers defined the border between Greece and the Ottoman Empire.
- 1833 – Convention of Kütahya (English version) (peace treaty of the First Egyptian-Turkish War).
- 1833 - Treaty of Hünkâr İskelesi (Unkiar Skelessi). An alliance between the Ottoman Empire and the Russian Empire is created, as well as a guarantee that the Ottomans would close the Dardanelles to any foreign warships if the Russians requested such action.
- 1838 – Treaty of Balta Liman; British soil commercial treaty (English version) entered into.
- 1839–41 – Edict of Gülhane, Tanzimat starts, Second Egyptian-Turkish War (~ 1841) (English version).
- 1840 – London Convention (peace treaty of the Second Egyptian-Turkish War); Oriental Crisis of 1840.
- 1841 – London Straits Convention (English version). The Treaty of Hünkâr İskelesi is discarded and the passage of the Russian fleet from Bosphorus and Dardanelles is prohibited.
- 1846 in Baku – Oil well drilling machine was made. There were hand-dug oil well before that.
- 1849 – Convention of Balta Liman.
- 1852–62 – Herzegovina uprising.
- 1852–53 – Montenegrin–Ottoman War.
- 1853–56 – Crimean War.
- 1854 – Epirus Revolt and the Macedonian rebellion.
- 1856 – Treaty of Paris (peace treaty of the Crimean War).
- 1856 – Ottoman Reform Edict of 1856
- 1860 – Civil conflict in Mount Lebanon and Damascus.
- 1861–62 – Montenegrin–Ottoman War.
- 1863–78 – Circassian genocide; up to 3,500,000 Circassians were either killed by the Russians or forcibly expelled to the Ottoman Empire.
- 1866–69 – Cretan revolt.
- 1867 – Alfred Nobel invents dynamite.
- 1870 – Bulgarian Exarchate.
- 1872 – Russia sold overseas oil well drilling rights in Baku to investors.
- 1875–78 – Great Eastern Crisis; the outbreak of several uprisings and wars in the Ottoman Empire that resulted in the intervention of the Great Powers:
  - The Serbian Herzegovina uprising (1875–1877).
  - The Bulgarian Stara Zagora Uprising of 1875 and the April Uprising of 1876.
  - The Salonika Incident of 1876.
  - The Macedonian Razlovci uprising of 1876.
  - 1876 Ottoman coup d'état; First Constitutional Era and First Ottoman constitution enacted.
  - Nobel Brothers in Baku.
  - Montenegrin–Ottoman War (1876–1878).
  - Serbian–Ottoman Wars (1876–1878).
    - First Serbian–Ottoman War (1876–1877).
- 1876–77 – Constantinople Conference; the Great Powers agreed on a project for political reforms in Bosnia and in the Ottoman territories with a majority-Bulgarian population. The Ottoman Empire rejected the reforms, depriving it of Western support.
- 1877 – Budapest Convention of 1877
- 1877–78 – Russo-Turkish War; Romanian War of Independence, Second Serbian–Ottoman War, Liberation of Bulgaria, independence of Montenegro and Serbia.
- 1878 – Treaty of San Stefano (preliminary peace treaty of the Russo-Turkish War of 1877–78); an autonomous Principality of Bulgaria was created after almost 500 years of Ottoman rule, with enlarged borders that encompassed nearly all of Macedonia and Thrace and direct access to the Mediterranean, greatly benefiting Russia and alarming the Great Powers. These gains were never implemented, being reversed during Congress of Berlin in the same year.
- 1878 – Cyprus Convention, Congress of Berlin and Treaty of Berlin (final peace treaty of the Russo-Turkish War of 1877–78); the Great Powers recognized the independence of Romania, Serbia and Montenegro, and the Principality of Bulgaria had its borders greatly reduced, with the creation of the autonomous province of Eastern Rumelia and the return of Macedonia to the Ottomans. Austria-Hungary gained the right to occupy Bosnia and Herzegovina, the British occupied Cyprus and Russia annexed Southern Bessarabia and the oblasts of Kars and Batum.
- 1878–79 – Kresna–Razlog uprising.
- 1879–82 – Urabi revolt against the khedive Tewfik Pasha and the British and French influence over Egypt.
- 1881 – French conquest of Tunisia.
- 1882 – Anglo-Egyptian War; establishment of the British military occupation of Egypt.
- 1885 – Bulgarian unification, Bulgarian Crisis (1885–1888) and Serbo-Bulgarian War.
- 1894–96 – Hamidian massacres of Armenians in the Ottoman Empire.
- 1896 – Ottoman coup d'état attempt.
- 1897 – Greco-Turkish War. Treaty of Constantinople.
- 1899 – German Baghdad Railway won the right-of-way. United Kingdom that has been competing Second Boer War withdrew in war expenses increased.
- 1903 – Ilinden–Preobrazhenie Uprising.
- 1904–05 – Russo-Japanese War.
- 1905 – Yıldız assassination attempt. Armenian Revolutionary Federation attempted to assassinate Abdulhamid II.

Ottoman territory before the First Balkan War in 1912

- 1908 – Young Turk Revolution
- 1908 – Bulgarian Declaration of Independence, Bosnia and Herzegovina annexation.
- 1909 – 31 March incident
- 1909 – Goudi coup
- 1911-12 - Italo-Turkish War, loss of Libya and the Dodecanese Islands.
- 1912 – Balkan League is formed by four Balkan countries. Ottoman coup d'état.
- 1912–13 – Balkan Wars.
  - 1912–13 – London Conference, First Balkan War, Albanian Declaration of Independence and Ottoman coup d'état.
  - 1913 – Treaty of London, Greek–Serbian Alliance and Second Balkan War.
- 1913 – Treaty of Bucharest, Treaty of Constantinople and Treaty of Athens; Turkey lost Crete and European territory except for Edirne and Istanbul.
- 1914–18 – World War I; alliance with Germany; Turkish loss.
  - 1915–17 – Constantinople Agreement, Sykes–Picot Agreement, Sazonov–Paléologue Agreement and Agreement of Saint-Jean-de-Maurienne; The Allies defined their spheres of influence and control in an eventual partition of the Ottoman Empire.
  - 1915–17 – Armenian genocide.
- 1918–23 – Occupation of Istanbul by British, French, Italian, and Greek forces, in accordance with the Armistice of Mudros.
- 1918–21 – Franco-Turkish War.
- 1919–22 – Greco-Turkish War and Turkish War of Independence.
- 1920 – Treaty of Sèvres (peace treaty following the end of WWI).
- 1920–22 – Operation Nemesis.
- 1920 – Turkish–Armenian War.
- 1921 – Cilicia Peace Treaty, Treaty of Moscow, Treaty of Kars and Treaty of Ankara.
- 1922 – Armistice of Mudanya and Abolition of the Ottoman sultanate.
- 1923 – Population exchange between Greece and Turkey, Treaty of Lausanne and Proclamation of the Republic of Turkey.
- 1924 – Abolition of the Caliphate.

== See also ==
- Armenian question
- Decline and modernization of the Ottoman Empire
- Great Game
- Greek Plan
- History of Egypt under the British
- History of Egypt under the Muhammad Ali dynasty
- International relations (1648–1814)
- International relations (1814–1919)
- Polish question
- Russia and the Middle East
- Sick man of Europe
- Thracian question

== Bibliography ==
- Anderson, M.S. The Eastern Question, 1774–1923: A Study in International Relations (1966)
- Bitis, Alexander. Russia and the Eastern Question: Army, Government and Society, 1815–1833 (2007)
- Bolsover, George H. "Nicholas I and the Partition of Turkey." Slavonic and East European Review (1948): 115-145 online.
- Bronza, Boro (2010). "The Habsburg Monarchy and the Projects for Division of the Ottoman Balkans, 1771-1788". Empires and Peninsulas: Southeastern Europe between Karlowitz and the Peace of Adrianople, 1699–1829. Berlin: LIT Verlag. pp. 51–62. ISBN 9783643106117.
- Bridge, F.R. From Sadowa to Sarajevo: The Foreign Policy of Austria-Hungary 1866–1914 (1972)
- Clayton, G.D. Britain and the Eastern Question: Missolonghi to Gallipoli (University of London Press, 1971)
- Faroqhi, Suraiya N. The Cambridge History of Turkey (Volume 3, 2006) excerpt and text search
- Frary, Lucien J. and Mara Kozelsky, eds. Russian-Ottoman Borderlands: The Eastern Question Reconsidered (University of Wisconsin, 2014)
- Gallagher, Tom. Outcast Europe: The Balkans, 1789-1989: From the Ottomans to Milosevic (2013).
- Gavrilis, George. "The Greek—Ottoman Boundary as Institution, Locality, and Process, 1832–1882." American Behavioral Scientist (2008) 51#10 pp: 1516–1537.
- Gingeras, Ryan. Fall of the Sultanate: The Great War and the End of the Ottoman Empire, 1908-1922 (Oxford UP, 2016).
- Hale, William. Turkish Foreign Policy, 1774–2000. (2000). 375 pp.
- Hall, Richard C. The Balkan Wars, 1912–1913: Prelude to the First World War (2000)
- Hayes, Paul. Modern British Foreign Policy: The Nineteenth Century 1814-80 (1975) pp. 233–69.
- Hupchick, Dennis P. The Balkans: from Constantinople to communism (2004)
- Kent, Marian, ed. The great powers and the end of the Ottoman Empire (Routledge, 2005)
- King, Charles. Black Sea: A History (2004), 276p. covers: 400 to 1999
- Langer, William. An Encyclopedia of World History (5th ed. 1973); highly detailed outline of events
- Langer, William. European Alliances and Alignments 1870–1890 (2nd ed. 1950); advanced history
- Langer, William. The Diplomacy of Imperialism 1890–1902 (2nd ed. 1950); advanced history
- Macfie, Alexander Lyon. The Eastern Question, 1774–1923 (New York: Longman, 1996); Seminar Studies in History series
- Marriott, J. A. R. The Eastern question; an historical study in European diplomacy (4th ed. 1940) online
- Matthew, H. C. G. Gladstone, 1809–1874 (1988); Gladstone, 1875–1898 (1995) excerpt & text search vol 1
- Mihneva, Rumjana. "The Muscovite Tsardom, the Ottoman Empire and the European Diplomacy (Mid-Sixteenth-End of Seventeenth Century). Part 1." Études balkaniques 3+ 4 (1998): 98–129.
- Millman, Richard (1979). Britain and the Eastern Question, 1875–78. Oxford University Press.
- Rathbone, Mark. "Gladstone, Disraeli and the Bulgarian Horrors." History Review 50 (2004): 3–7.
- Rich, Norman. Great Power Diplomacy: 1814–1914 (1991), comprehensive survey
- Šedivý, Miroslav. Metternich, the Great Powers and the Eastern Question (Plzeň: University of West Bohemia Press, 2013) major scholarly study 1032pp
- Šedivý, Miroslav. Crisis Among the Great Powers: The Concert of Europe and the Eastern Question (Bloomsbury Publishing, 2016) excerpt.
- Seton-Watson, Hugh. The Russian Empire 1801–1917 (1967) excerpt and text search
- Seton-Watson, R. W. Disraeli, Gladstone, and the Eastern Question (1935)
- Schumacher, Leslie Rogne. "The Eastern Question as a Europe question: Viewing the ascent of 'Europe' through the lens of Ottoman decline." Journal of European Studies 44, no. 1 (2014): 64-80.
- Smith, M.S. The Eastern Question, 1774-1923 (1966)
- Stavrianos, L.S. The Balkans Since 1453 (1958), major scholarly history; online free to borrow
- Taylor, A.J.P. (1956). The Struggle for Mastery in Europe, 1848–1918. Oxford University Press.

=== Historiography ===
- Abazi, Enika, and Albert Doja. "The past in the present: time and narrative of Balkan wars in media industry and international politics." Third World Quarterly 38.4 (2017): 1012–1042. Deals with travel writing, media reporting, diplomatic records, policy-making, truth claims and expert accounts.
- Case, Holly. The Age of Questions (Princeton University Press, 2018) excerpt
- Schumacher, Leslie Rogne. "The Eastern Question as a Europe question: Viewing the ascent of 'Europe' through the lens of Ottoman decline." Journal of European Studies 44.1 (2014): 64-80. Long bibliography pp 77-80
- Tusan, Michelle. "Britain and the Middle East: New Historical Perspectives on the Eastern Question," History Compass (2010), 8#3 pp 212–222.
