= Treaty of Hünkâr İskelesi =

1833 treaty between the Ottoman and Russian empires

The Treaty of Hünkâr İskelesi (once commonly spelled Unkiar Skelessi, and translating to The Treaty of "the Royal Pier" or "the Sultan's Pier") was a treaty signed between the Russian Empire and the Ottoman Empire on July 8, 1833, following the military aid of Russia against Muhammad Ali Pasha of Egypt that same year. The treaty brought about an alliance between the two powers, as well as a guarantee that the Ottomans would close the Dardanelles to any foreign warships if the Russians requested such action. The treaty would have significant consequences regarding the Ottoman Empire's foreign relations, especially with Great Britain and Ireland, as the terms of the treaty worried the other great powers of Europe.

== Background ==
Mehmed Ali, ostensibly only a vassal of the Ottoman Empire, was seeking to increase his personal power and gain control over Palestine, Syria, and Arabia. In order to justify the assault on his liege, he used the pretext of a personal dispute with the pasha of Acre.

=== Egyptian advance ===
In late 1831, he sent his newly reformed army towards Syria, under the command of his son Ibrahim Pasha, resulting in the Egyptian–Ottoman War (1831–1833) against the Ottoman sultan, Mahmud II. Ibrahim's forces quickly captured Gaza and Jerusalem, and successfully laid siege to Acre before marching on to Aleppo and Damascus, “winning successive battles against Mahmud’s new troops, which were not yet a match for so practiced an enemy”; by June 18, 1832, Ibrahim had managed to seize control of all of Syria. For a time, the Egyptian army halted while Mehmed Ali attempted to negotiate with the Sultan. However, once it became clear that diplomacy had failed, Ibrahim led his forces into Anatolia itself where he rallied opponents of the Sultan and captured the city of Konya on November 21. Mahmud II dispatched a large army to try to halt the Egyptian advance, but it was crushed in the Battle of Konya on December 21 and “in a single blow [opened] the way for a complete conquest of Anatolia.” Ibrahim continued his advance until he was within striking distance of Istanbul, the Ottoman capital.

=== Response ===
Panic spread through the imperial city as the Egyptian army pushed closer to the seat of Ottoman authority. Mahmud II urgently dispatched pleas for assistance to both Britain and France, but was turned down due to domestic concerns as well as the involvement of both nations in managing the state of affairs after the recently ended Belgian Revolution. Lord Kinross argues that this left the Sultan no choice but to call upon his former enemy, Russia, for assistance. According to Bailey, the response from the Tsar was so positive and swift, that Mahmud II hesitated in accepting, believing it might be a trap. Nevertheless, the Sultan was willing to welcome any help he could receive, and accepted the Russian offer. The Tsar immediately dispatched a sizeable force of troops to block the potential Egyptian advance on Istanbul. It is unclear exactly how many troops the Tsar sent; Lord Kinross claims it was an army of approximately 18,000 men in total while Bailey suggests it may have been a force more than twice that size of nearly 40,000 troops. Regardless of the exact size of the Russian host, it was formidable enough to cause Ibrahim to decide to begin negotiating with the Sultan rather than risk a battle with the Russians. Thus, the mere presence of Russian troops was enough to halt the Egyptian onslaught.

=== European reaction ===
The presence of Russian troops so close to the Ottoman capital also worried Britain and France considerably. Seeing this potential threat forced the two nations into action. Lord Palmerston, the British Foreign Secretary, led the effort and brought strong diplomatic pressure “to bear upon the Sultan to insist on the Russian withdrawal, in return for concessions to Mehmed Ali and an Anglo-French guarantee against his further invasion.” Diplomacy was not the only tool they employed however, as both the British and the French dispatched fleets to the Dardanelles. This action served the dual purpose of coercing the Sultan to accept their demanding proposal, while also threatening the Russians and checking any further military action they might take.

=== Consequences of the conflict and intervention ===
The Sultan finally submitted, which led to the Convention of Kütahya in May 1833, which officially granted Mehmed Ali control of Syria, Adana, Tripoli, Crete, and Egypt, though these titles were not guaranteed to be hereditary upon his death. As soon as this peace was established, the Russians began the process of removing their troops from Ottoman territory. It seemed as though things had come to a reasonable end, but soon after the withdrawal of all Russian troops, the British government learned that two days prior to the completion of this evacuation, the Sultan Mahmud II had signed the Treaty of Hünkâr İskelesi with Tsar Nicholas I. This realization alarmed British leaders, as it seemed to indicate that Russia now held an enormous amount of influence over the Ottoman Empire and its affairs.

== Treaty ==
The quickly negotiated treaty, signed on July 8, 1833, consisted primarily of a defensive alliance between Russia and the Ottoman Empire which was to initially last for eight years, and included pledges to discuss matters of security with one another. This bound the two empires together in a significant way and seemed to give the Russians the opportunity for future military interventions in the Ottoman Empire, effectively making it a protectorate of the Russian state. While this portion of the treaty was itself important, the most significant feature was its secret article.

=== Secret Article ===
The Bosporus (red), the Dardanelles (yellow), and the Sea of Marmara in between, are known collectively as the "Turkish Straits". Modern borders are shown.

This article called for an alternative to Ottoman military support per the terms of the treaty; rather than sending troops and arms in support of their Russian allies, the Ottomans would close the Dardanelles to all foreign warships at Russia's command. Below is the full text of the secret article:

“In virtue of one of the clauses of Article I of the Patent Treaty of Defensive Alliance concluded between the Imperial Court of Russia and the Sublime Porte, the two High Contracting Parties, are bound to afford to each other, mutually substantial aid, and the most efficacious assistance, for the safety of their respective dominions. Nevertheless, His Majesty the Emperor of all the Russias, wishing to spare the Sublime Ottoman Porte the expense and inconvenience which might be occasioned to it by affording such substantial aid, will not ask for that aid, if circumstances should place the Sublime Porte under the obligation of furnishing it. The Sublime Porte, in place of aid which it is bound to furnish in case of need according to the principal of reciprocity of the Patent Treaty, shall confine its action in favour of the Imperial Court of Russia to closing the Strait of the Dardanelles, that is to say, to not allowing any foreign vessel of war to enter therein, under any pretext whatsoever.”

=== Interpretations of the Secret Article ===
This article was highly controversial and its true meaning is still a matter of debate. There is disagreement over what exactly the terms of the closing of the Dardanelles would be. Some interpret the lack of any specific mention of Russian warships to mean that their ships were not included with those to be barred passage through the Dardanelles. Others point out that this same lack of any specific provision for Russian warships indicates that the treaty did not grant them any special rights. There is also debate over what is meant by the phrase “in case of need.” Some believe this meant only while Russia was at war, while others interpreted it to mean that the Dardanelles would be closed to foreign warships at all times. These speculations began when the British discovered the full scope of the treaty. The secret article was not officially communicated to the British government until January 16, 1834, but they were aware of it several months before that point.

The British interpreted the treaty and its secret clause to have a potentially great impact on their relations with Russia, the Ottoman Empire, and the established balance of power. Hale argues that Lord Palmerston was stung into action “since he mistakenly believed that [the treaty’s] secret clause had given Russian warships free passage through the straits.” Additionally, Palmerston and the rest of the British government saw that “while the immediate advantages of the treaty were slight, the ‘potential advantage to Russia’ was very great, in that ‘in accustoming the Porte to the position of vassal’ Russia had ‘prepared the way for a repetition of the 1833 expedition.’” They feared that this potential for future Russian intervention in the Ottoman Empire would threaten British connections with India and trade in the Near East as a whole, though as Bailey puts it, “The Foreign Secretary’s immediate concern, however, was the problem of the Straits.” This interpretation of the treaty was to shape British foreign policy towards the Ottoman Empire for decades to come.

== Consequences of the treaty ==
According to Bailey, the signing of the Treaty of Hünkâr İskelesi was what fully awakened Britain to “the importance of the Ottoman Empire’s geographical, political, and economic position in Europe.” In the short term, the British protested the treaty, claiming that it violated the Anglo-Ottoman Treaty of 1809, which set forth terms that no foreign warship would be allowed to enter the straits. Their formal protest concluded “if the stipulations of that treaty (Unkiar Skelessi) should hereafter lead to the armed interference of Russia in the internal affairs of Turkey, the British government will hold itself at liberty to act upon such an occasion, in any manner which the circumstances of the moment may appear to require.” The French also issued a similar statement regarding their concerns about possible Russian military interference. These two statements were indicative of how seriously the terms of the treaty were taken by the Western powers.

In the longer term, the British became convinced that a different approach was needed, and committed to a policy that “the Ottoman Empire was to be preserved, supported, reformed, and strengthened.” From that point forward, the British, under Palmerston's leadership, took a number of actions to enact this new policy towards the Ottoman Empire. These ranged from increased trade with the Ottomans to a strengthening of the British fleet in the Levant and offers of both military and naval missions to Mahmud II both to aid the Sultan should Mehmed Ali threaten further military action, and “as a gesture to redress Britain’s former neglect.”

While Britain certainly took the most active role, it was not the only European power which took an interest in the Ottoman Empire as a result of this treaty. Not long after the signing of the treaty, Austria and Prussia joined Russia in the Münchengrätz Convention of September 18, 1833, which committed the powers to opposing further expansion by Mehmed Ali and to “maintain[ing] Ottoman integrity.” In July 1840, a broader coalition was formed including Britain, Austria, Prussia, and Russia, which agreed to protect the Sultan's government against Mehmed Ali; this agreement, known as the Convention of London (1840) also required that the Ottomans declare that the straits would be closed to all non-Ottoman warships in peacetime. European support, specifically that of the British, also aided in the ultimate submission of Mehmet Ali; in an agreement signed in June 1841, he accepted the limitation of his army in exchange for guarantees of hereditary governorship of Egypt for his family. This marked “the emergence of Britain as a more active player in the Near Eastern power game, and the Ottoman Empire’s main ally for the next 37 years.” Thus, the Treaty of Hünkâr İskelesi had long-lasting effects on the future of the Ottoman Empire, and especially on European outlooks towards that same future.

== End of the treaty ==
Not long after its signing, the terms of the treaty would be progressively weakened by other treaties and agreements. The Convention of London (1840) took the first big step by compelling the Ottomans to keep the straits closed to all non-Ottoman warships in peacetime. This helped assuage the British fear that the Treaty of Hünkâr İskelesi had effectively granted the Russian fleet free passage through the straits and into the Mediterranean. Another step towards nullifying the treaty came in the form of the London Straits Convention the following year. This agreement barred all warships from entering the straits, save those of allies of the Sultan in wartime. While it may seem that this agreement does not change much, it is important to remember that at this point, Britain was one of the Sultan's allies. Thus, this would allow the British fleet to enter the straits in times of war, eliminating the perceived exclusive right of the Russians to do so. By this point, the most important aspect of the treaty had effectively been negated. Russo-Ottoman relations continued to deteriorate in the following decade, and while it is unclear when the Treaty of Hünkâr İskelesi was entirely invalidated, it can be said with certainty that the coming of the Crimean War meant the end of any potential for the continuation of the Russo-Ottoman alliance set out in the treaty.

== Works cited ==
- Balfour, Patrick (1977). The Ottoman Centuries: The Rise and Fall of the Turkish Empire. William Morrow and Company, Inc. ISBN 0-688-03093-9.
- Shaw, Stanford J.; Shaw, Ezel Kural (1977). Reform, Revolution, and Republic: The Rise of Modern Turkey, 1808-1975. History of the Ottoman Empire and Modern Turkey. Vol. 2. Cambridge University Press. ISBN 9780521214490.
- Bailey, Frank Edgar (1942). British Policy and the Turkish Reform Movement: A Study in Anglo-Turkish Relations, 1826-1853. Cambridge, MA: The Harvard University Printing Office.
- Aksan, Virginia H. (2007). Ottoman Wars 1700-1870: An Empire Besieged. London: Pearson Education Limited. doi:10.4324/9781315840826.
- Hale, William (2000). Turkish Foreign Policy 1774-2000. London: Frank Cass Publishers. ISBN 0-7146-8246-2.

== See also ==
- Eastern Question
- History of the Russo-Turkish wars
- The Second Egyptian-Ottoman War
- History of Ottoman Egypt
- Muhammad Ali dynasty
- Treaty of Balta Liman
