= Julien Pierre Anne Lalande =

French Navy officer and politician (1787–1844)

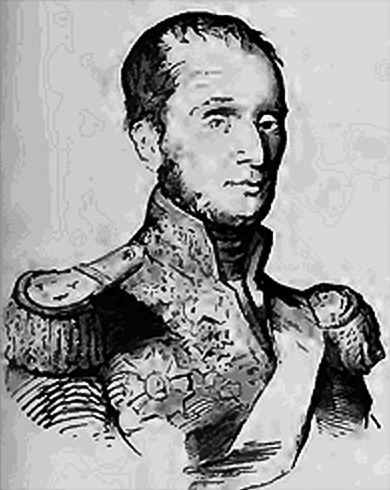
Vice admiral Lalande

Julien Pierre Anne Lalande (1787 in Le Mans, France – 1844 in Paris) was a French Navy officer and politician. He became one of the main actors in the Oriental Crisis of 1840 when the French Levant Squadron did not stop the Ottoman Kapudan Pasha (Grand Admiral) Ahmed Fawzi Pasha, who defected with the whole Ottoman Navy to the Sultan´s enemy, Muhammad Ali of Egypt ("Lalande affair").

Britain and Russia supported the Ottoman Sultan and formed an alliance with Austria and Prussia against Egypt (Convention of London). France was politically isolated and because it was threatened by a coalition of all its former enemies, France chose not to intervene when British and Austrian naval and infantry forces attacked Egyptian-held Beirut and Acre. Rear Admiral Lalande, however, offered Prime Minister Adolphe Thiers and King Louis Philippe I a plan to stop the Russian Black Sea fleet by occupying a few Dardanelles forts, to attack and capture or destroy the Royal Navy Levant Squadron and to use the Egypt-Ottoman fleet to transport French troops for an invasion in Ireland. Lalande was called back to Toulon and removed from his command.

After Thiers was replaced by François Guizot, Lalande became a deputy in the French National Assembly from 1840 to 1842 and supported Guizot´s policy.

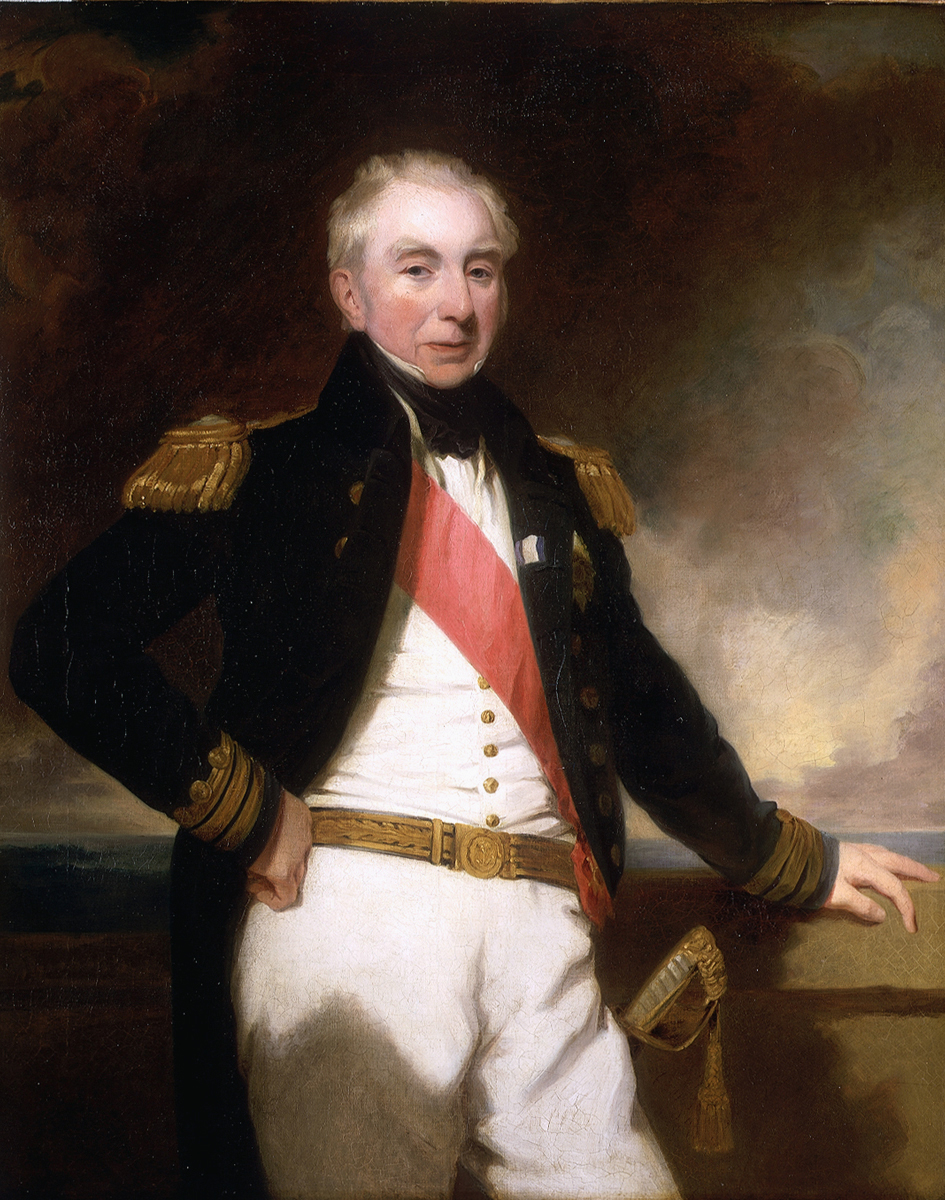
British Admiral Stopford was targeted as main enemy by Lalande

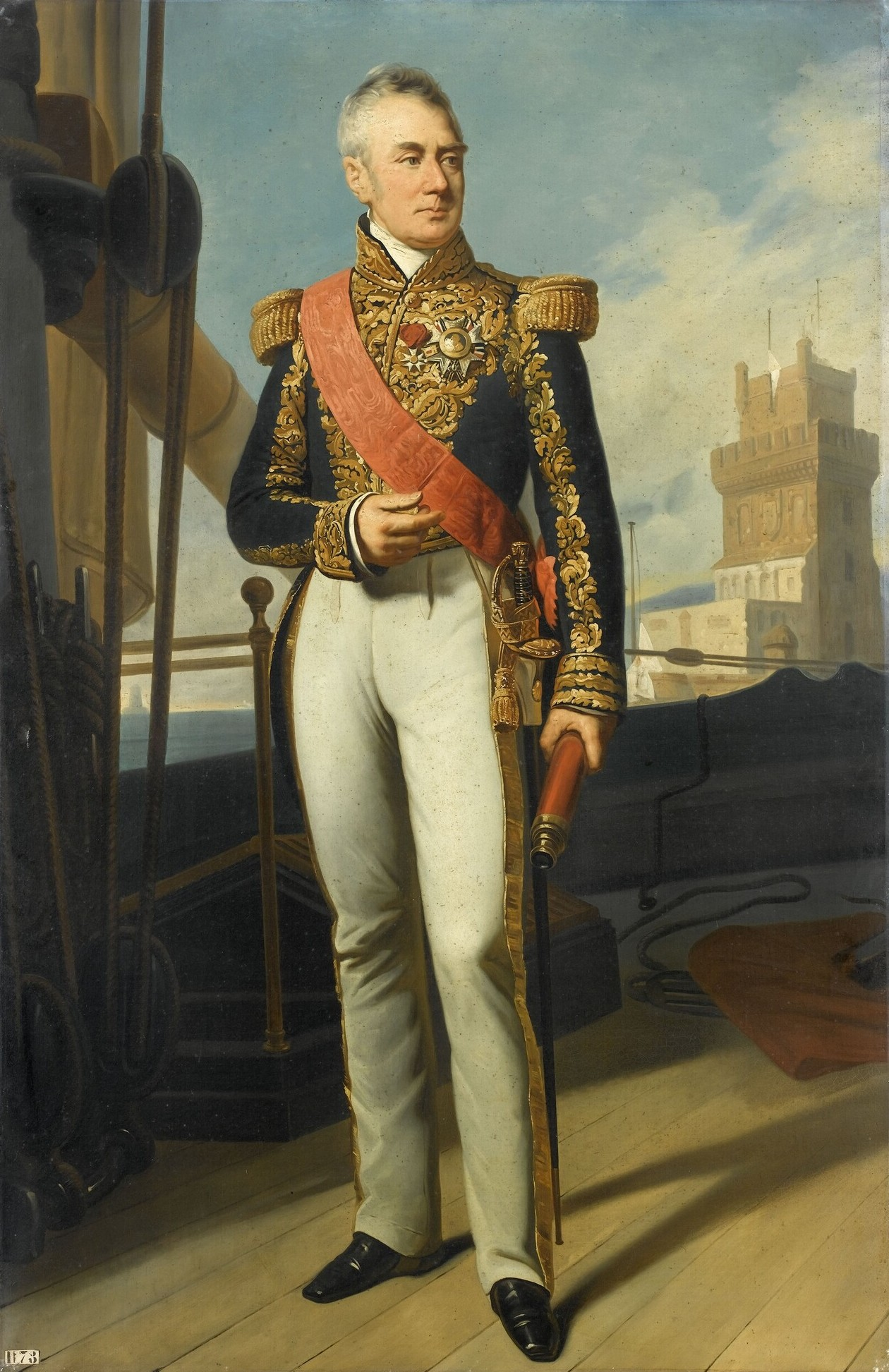
French Marine minister Roussin opposed Lalande´s plans

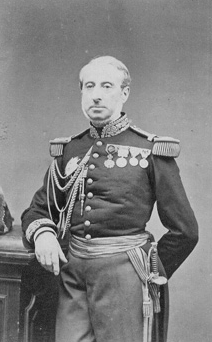
Lieutenant Jurien de La Gravière (later Admiral) was Lalande´s adjudant

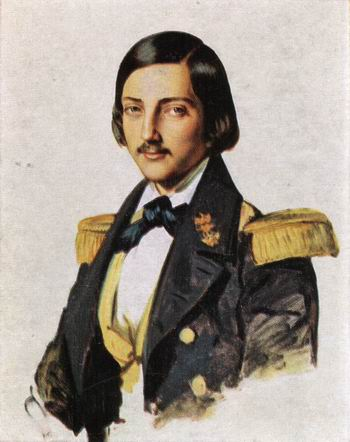
French Prince of Joinville, son of king Louis Phillipe, was Lalande´s ally

== Sources ==
- Assemblée nationale - Base de données historique des anciens députés: Julien Pierre Anne LALANDE
- Letitia Wheeler Ufford: The Pasha - how Mehemet Ali defied the West, 1839-1841, page 66. McFarland 2007
- Herders Conversations-Lexikon, page 771 (Frankreich). 1st edition 1854–1857
- Tobias Dannheimer (Hrsg.): Kemptner Zeitung für das Jahr 1841, page 34f
- George Winter: Nürnberger Allgemeine Zeitung, . Nürnberg 1841.
- Huhn (ed.) Neue Würzburger Zeitung für das Jahr 1840, . Würzburg 1840
- Carl Gerold (ed.): Journal des österreichischen Lloyd, pages 54, 97, 109 and 112. Triest 1840
- Wilhelm Fischer: Das Jahr 1839, page 279. Mannheim 1840
- Dr. Joseph Heinrich Wolf (ed.): Bayerische National-Zeitung, pages 495, 502, 566, 596, 606, 614, 679 and 691. München 1839
- Simeon Damjanow: Френската политика на Балканите 1829-1853, pages 156-161. Bulgarian Academy of Sciences, Sofia 1977
