= Thracian question =

Part of Eastern Question

The Thracian question was the issue of control over the territory and population as well as the historical heritage of Thrace, then under Ottoman Empire, in particular regarding the competing claims of Bulgaria and Greece over the region. The Thracian question was a part of the Eastern Question.

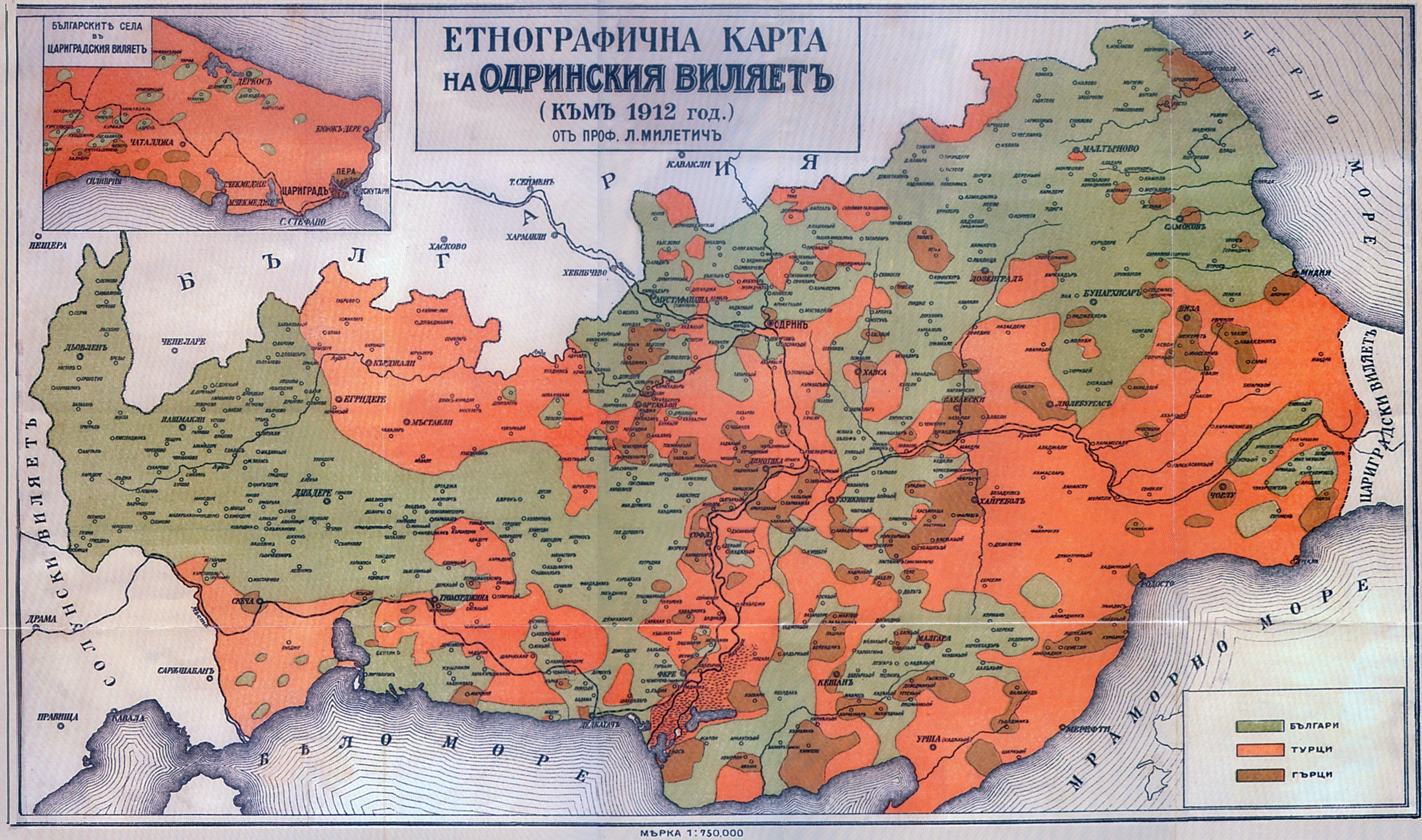
An ethnographic map of Thrace (Adrianople vilayet) in 1912. As per colour scheme: Bulgarians (green), Turks (orange) and Greeks (brown).

== History ==
The Thracian question was considered an integral part of the Bulgarian national question and a conditional indication of the struggle of the Bulgarians from Thrace to liberate them from Ottoman domination. The successful union of Eastern Rumelia with the Principality of Bulgaria in 1885 gave the struggling Thracians the hope that they would be able to achieve their liberation. They took an active part in the Ilinden–Preobrazhenie Uprising in 1903.
