= Saint George Greek Orthodox Cathedral, Acre =

Orthodox church and monastery in Acre, Israel

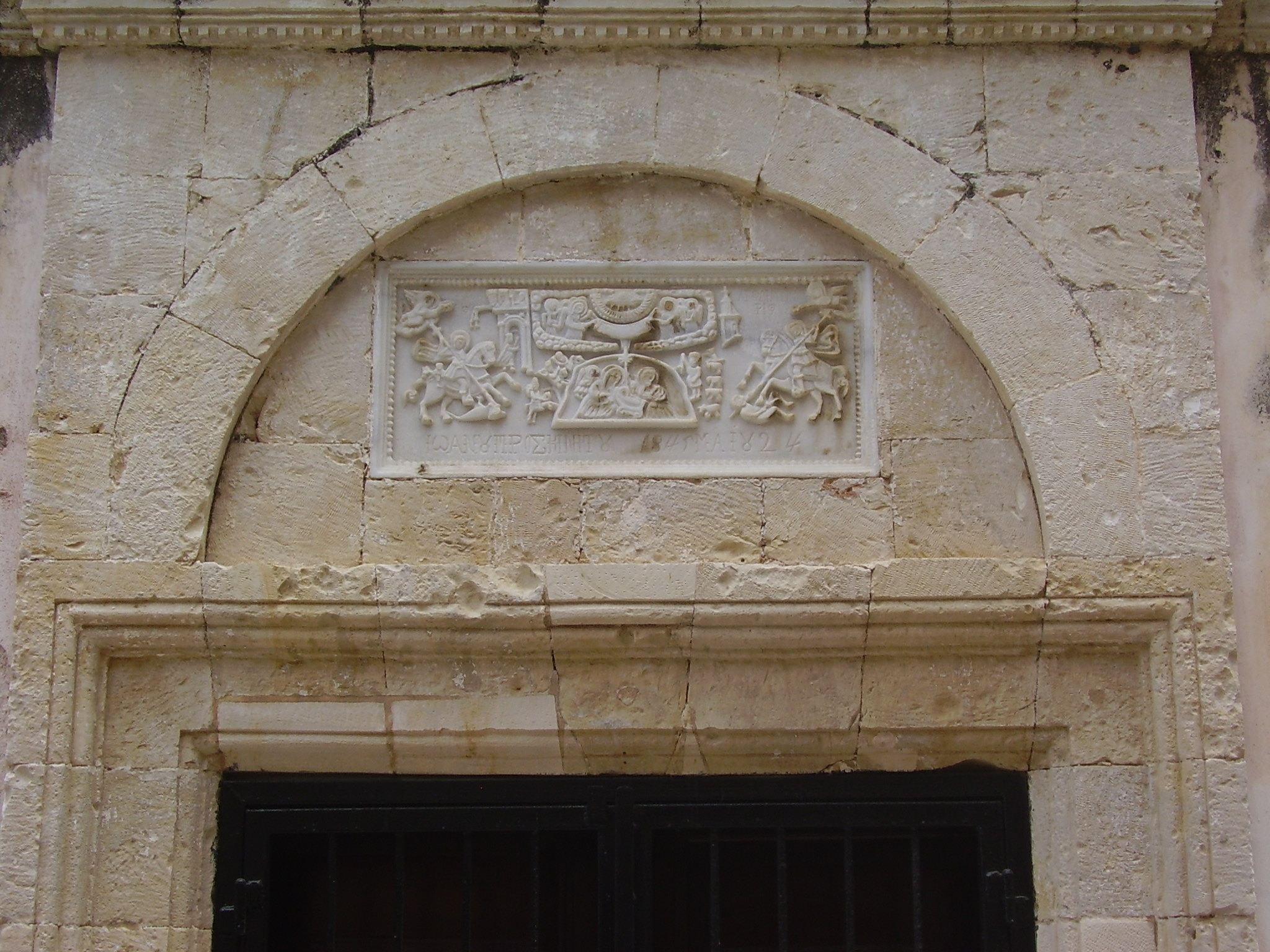
Saint George Church and Monastery.

Saint George Greek Orthodox Cathedral (Greek: Εκκλησία και Μοναστήρι του Αγίου Γεωργίου) is an Orthodox church and monastery located in Acre, Israel. It dates back to 16th century and is built on the ruins of a Byzantine church. The walls of the church were covered with carved wood.

To the east of the church, and five blocks away, there is another monastery built on the ruins of the Crusader buildings. The clergy in this monastery reside in the church because it is to the Bishop of Galilee for the Greek Orthodox. There is a list of marble monastery inscribed with the name of two British marines officers who fell during the battles of Acre in 1799 and 1840.

The church is the cathedral of the Metropolis of Ptolemais (Acre), a diocese of the Greek Orthodox Church of Jerusalem.

== Gallery ==
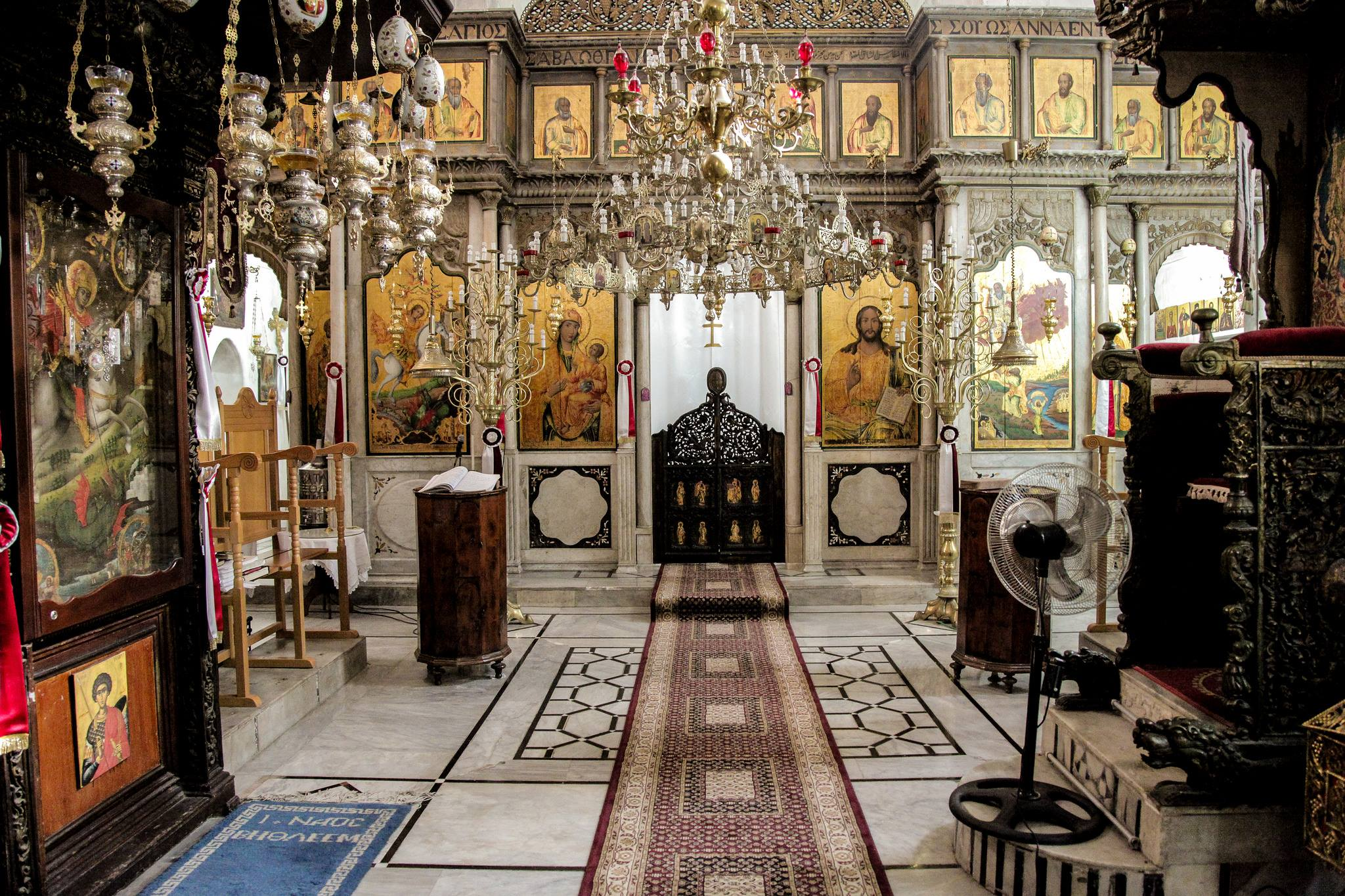
Church interior

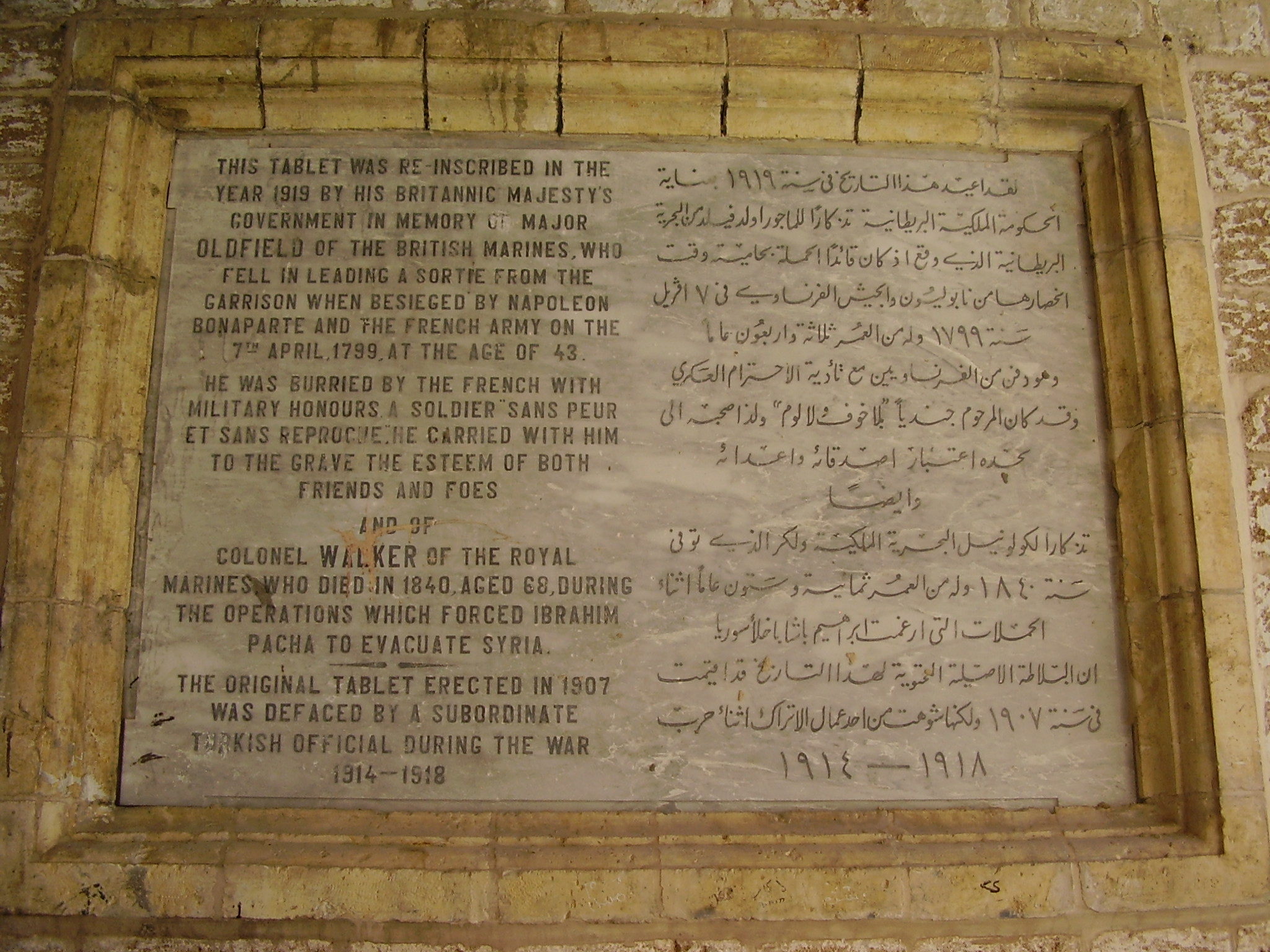
Plaque to British officers

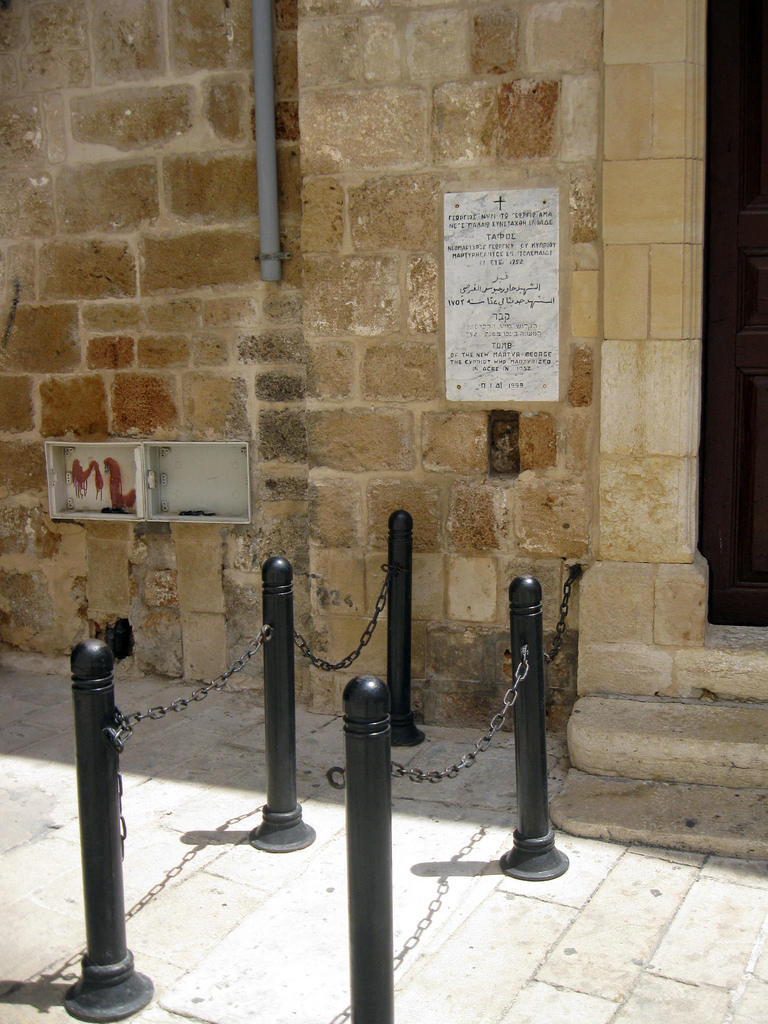
Tomb of neomartyr George of Cyprus (1752)

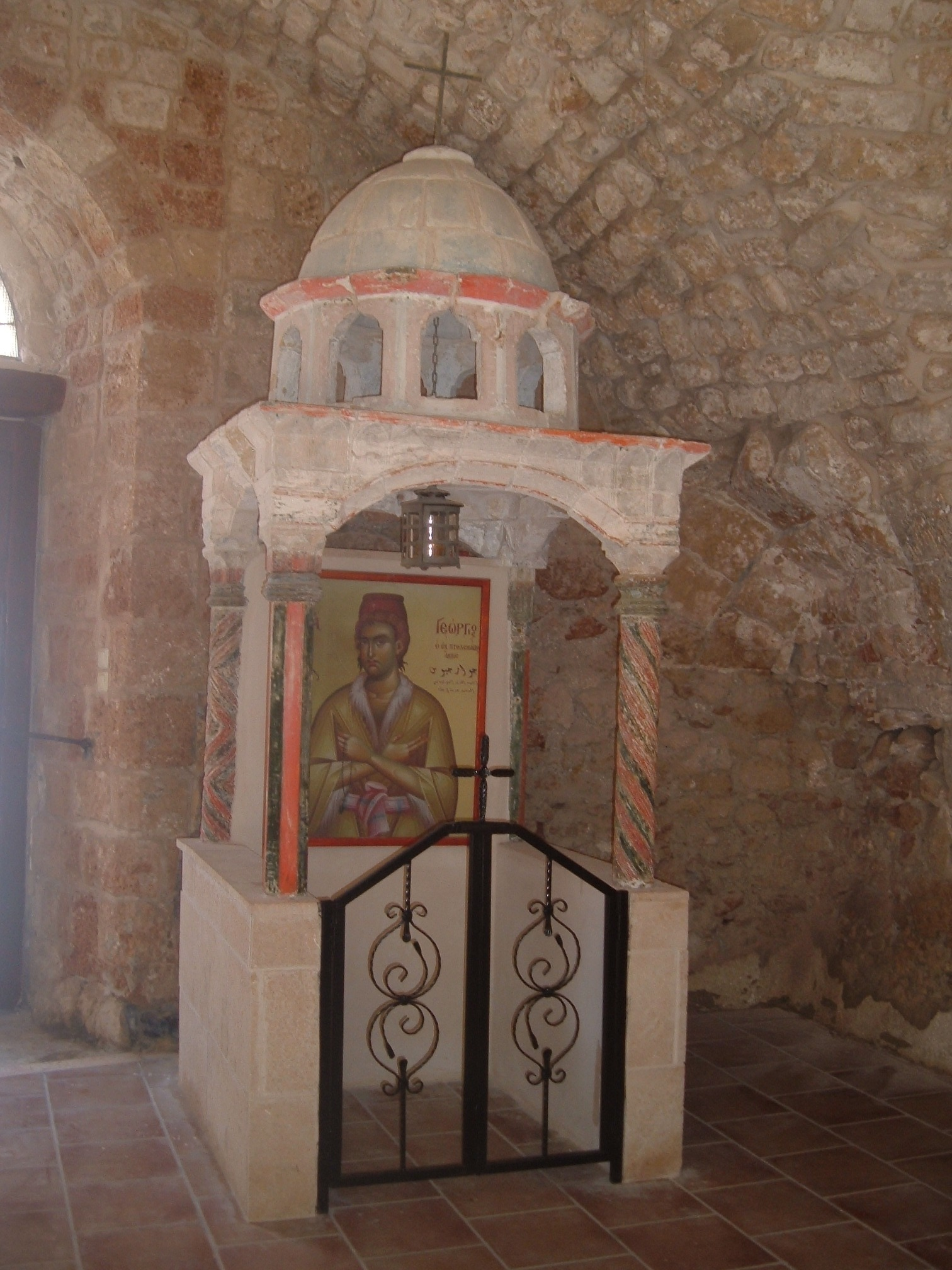
