= Storming and Capture of Acre =

1840 battle of the Egyptian–Ottoman War

Bombardment of Acre
- Part of the Egyptian–Ottoman War (1839–1841)
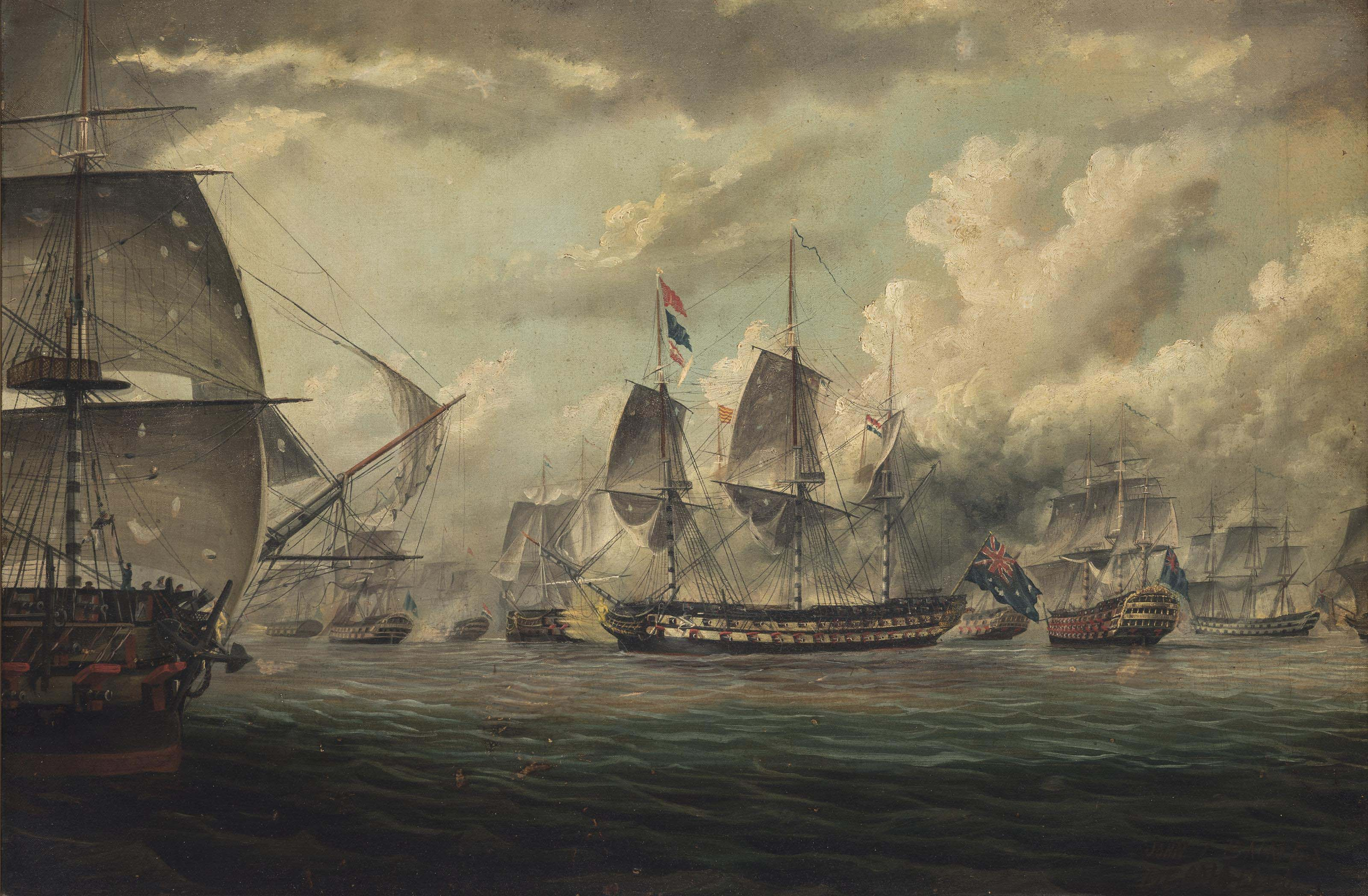
- HMS Bellerophon leading the bombardment of the Syrian fortress of Acre. Thomas Baines
Date	3 November 1840
Location	Acre, Ottoman Empire
Result	Allied victory

Belligerents
Ottoman Empire (United Kingdom of Great Britain and Ireland) United Kingdom; Austrian Empire	Egypt

Commanders and leaders
(United Kingdom of Great Britain and Ireland) Robert Stopford (Austrian Empire) Archduke Friedrich	Muhammad Ali Pasha

Strength
21 ships, 956 cannons: 4,700 men; 3,000 Ottomans; 1,500 British; 200 Austrians	5,000; 145 guns

Casualties and losses
100 killed and wounded	3,200 (2,000 killed and wounded, 1,200 prisoners)

The Bombardment of Acre or Storming and Capture of Acre (also known as the "Fourth Battle of Acre") occurred on 3 November 1840. The Oriental Crisis of 1840 was an episode in the Egyptian–Ottoman War in the eastern Mediterranean, triggered by the rebellious Wali of Egypt and Sudan Muhammad Ali Pasha's aims to establish a personal empire in the Egypt Eyalet.

Mehmet Ali had refused the conditions the Quadrilateral Alliance sought to impose. On 3 November, Acre was shelled by a combined British, Austrian and Ottoman fleet under Admiral Sir Robert Stopford. The scene reached its climax when at half past four, the fortress's gunpowder magazine exploded, causing colossal destruction. The town was largely destroyed and the Egyptians withdrew after Archduke Friedrich personally led a small landing party of Allied troops to capture the Citadel. Muhammad Ali of Egypt then came to terms.

== Gallery ==
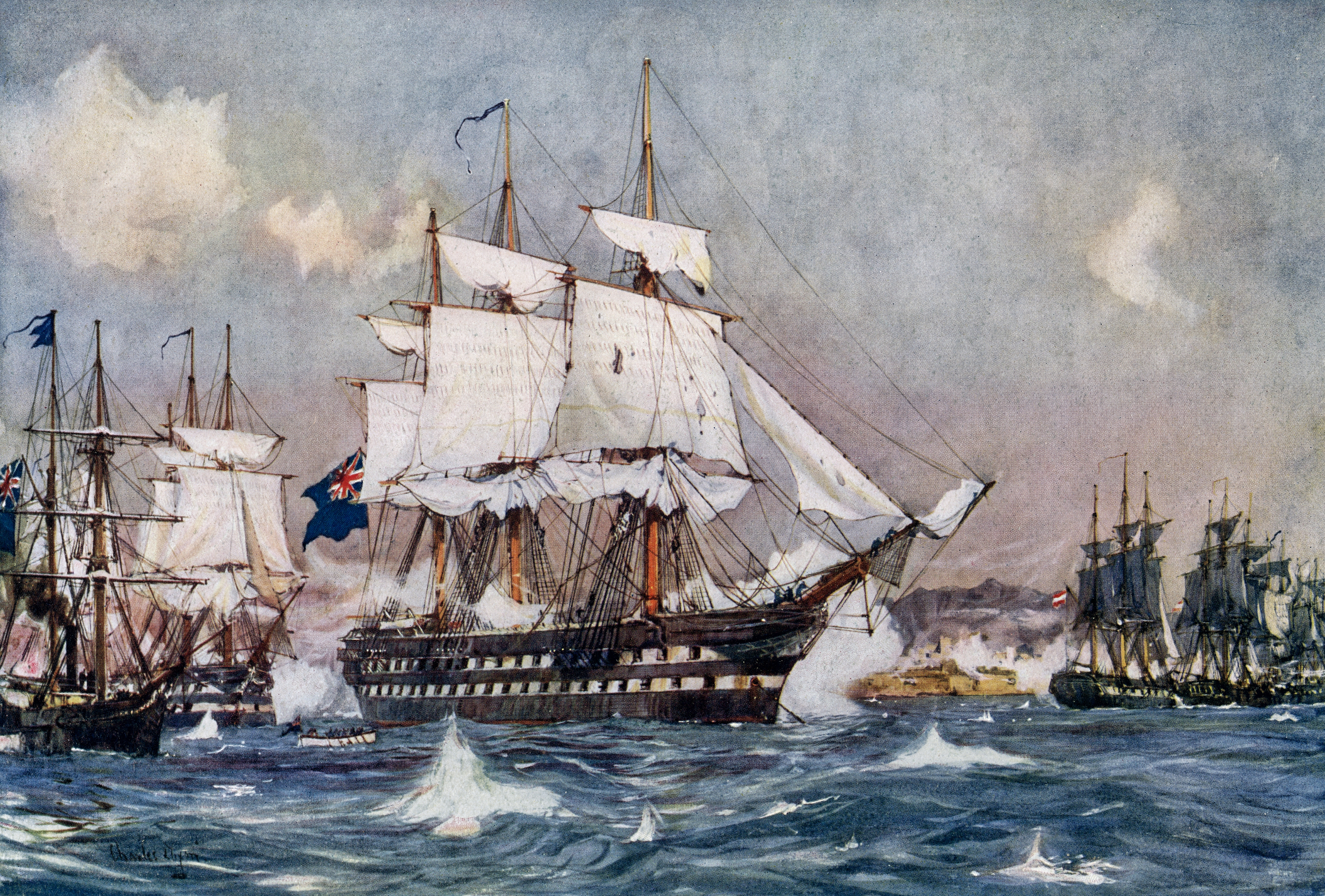
HMS Powerful at the Battle of St Jean d'Acre

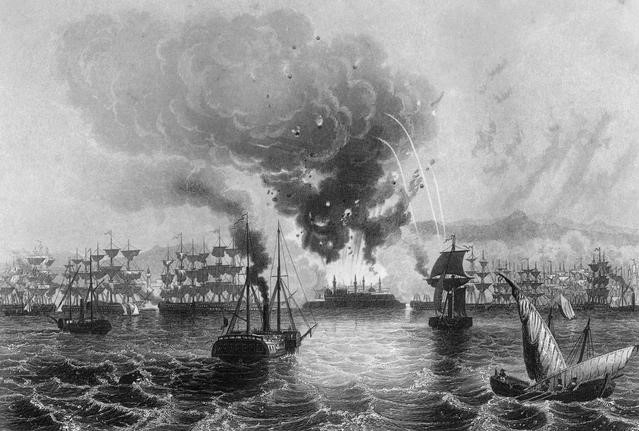
Bombardment of St Jean d'Acre, by Admiral Charles Napier, 3 November 1840

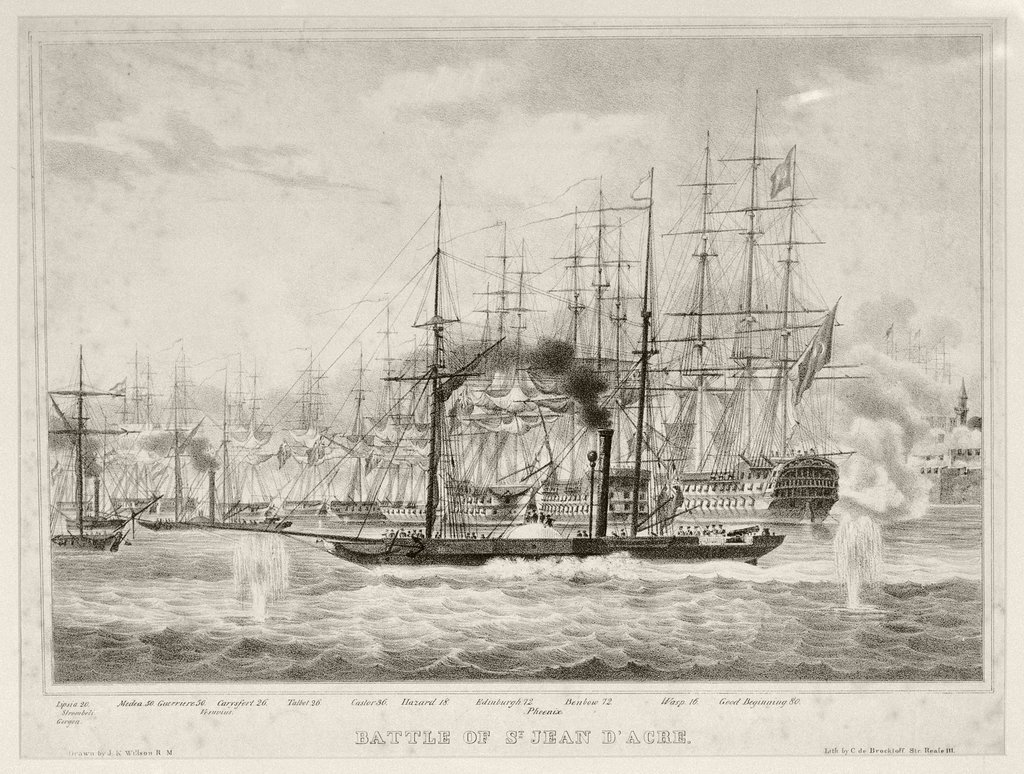
Another scene from the battle

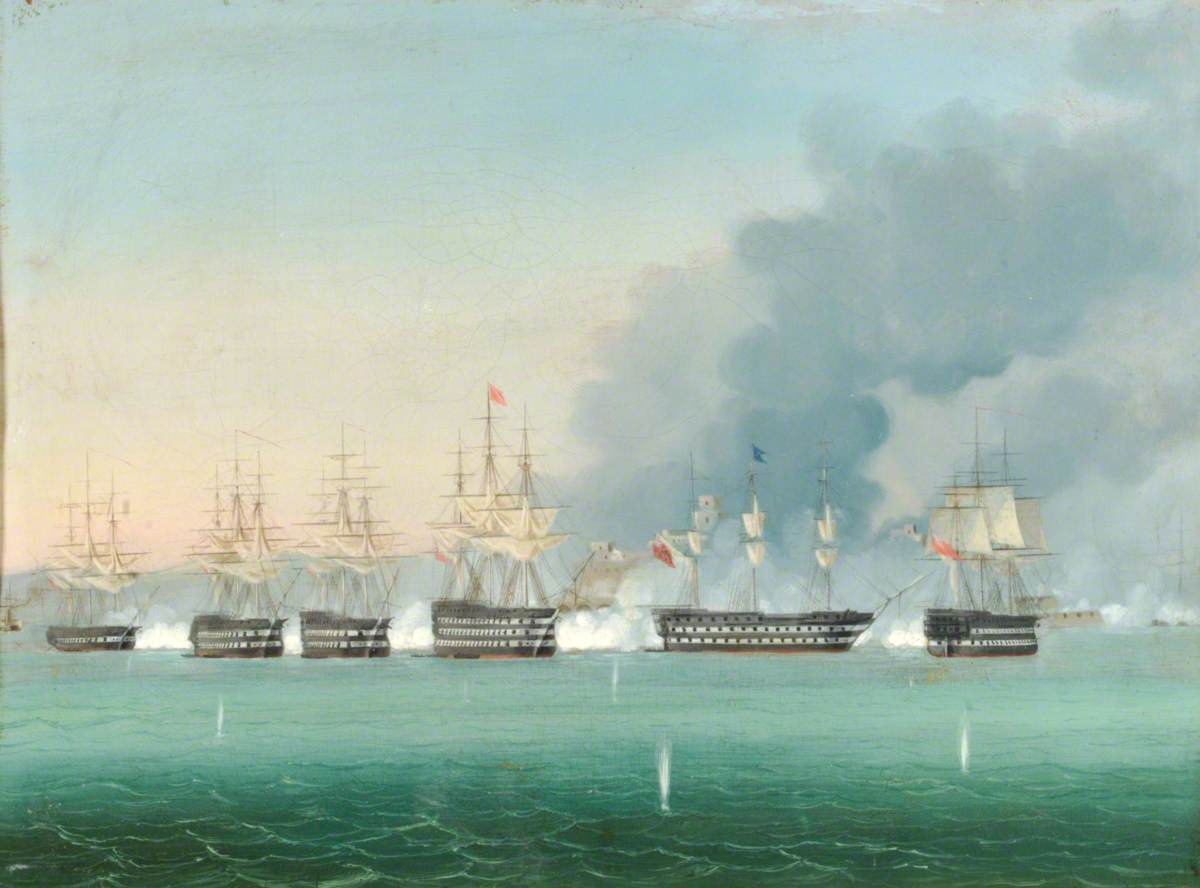
The Bombardment of Acre, 3 November 1840

== See also ==
- Saint George Greek Orthodox Cathedral, Acre

== Bibliography ==
- Bodart, Gaston (1908). Militär-historisches Kriegs–Lexikon (1618–1905) [Military-Historical War Lexicon (1618–1905)] (in German). Vienna: C. W. Stern.
