= Anglo-Turkish War (1807–1809) =

Naval conflict between Britain and the Ottoman Empire

- Part of the Napoleonic Wars
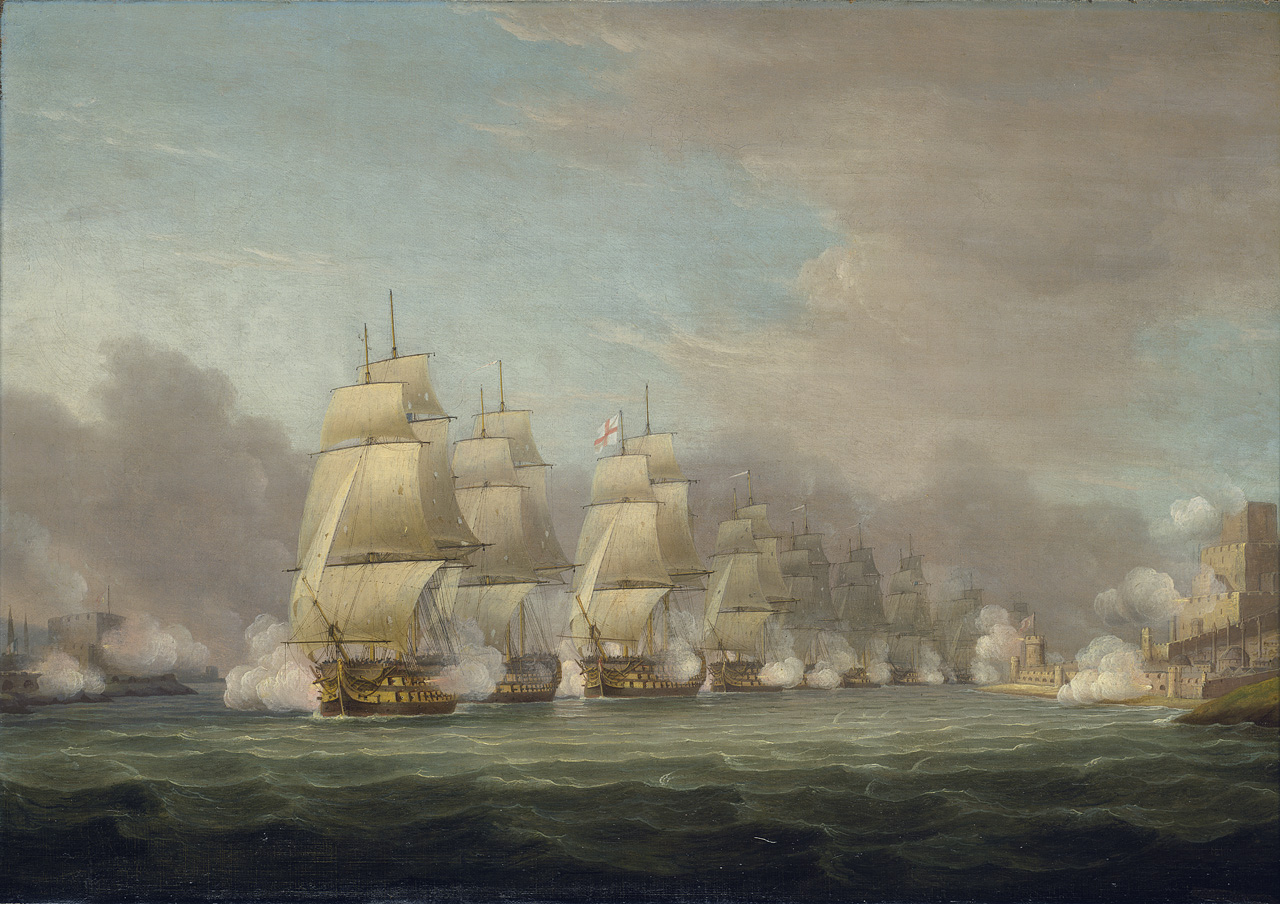
- The Dardanelles operation of the war
Date	1807–1809
Location	Dardanelles; Marmara Sea; Aegean Sea; Mediterranean Sea; Alexandria
Result	Treaty of the Dardanelles

Belligerents
Ottoman Empire; Egypt Eyalet; Supported by: (First French Empire) French Empire	(United Kingdom of Great Britain and Ireland) United Kingdom; Supported by: Russian Empire

Commanders and leaders
(Ottoman Empire) Selim III (Ottoman Empire) Mustafa IV (Ottoman Empire) Mahmud II; Muhammad Ali (First French Empire) Horace Sébastiani	(United Kingdom of Great Britain and Ireland) George III (United Kingdom of Great Britain and Ireland) John Duckworth

The Anglo-Turkish War of 1807–1809 was a part of the Napoleonic Wars, was fought between the United Kingdom of Great Britain and Ireland and the Ottoman Empire.

== Ultimatum ==
In the summer of 1806, during the War of the Third Coalition (of Great Britain, Russia, Austria, Sweden), Napoleon's ambassador General Count Sebastiani managed to convince the Porte (the central government of the Ottoman Empire) to cancel all special privileges granted to Russia in 1805 and to open the Ottoman straits (the Dardanelles) exclusively to French warships. In return, Napoleon promised to help the Sultan suppress the rebellion in Serbia and to recover lost territories. When the Russian army marched into Moldavia and Wallachia in 1806, the Ottomans declared war on Russia.

== Dardanelles operation ==
In September 1806, the British government pressured Sultan Selim III to expel Sebastiani, declare war on France, cede the Danubian Principalities to Russia, and surrender the Ottoman fleet, together with the forts on the Dardanelles, to the Royal Navy. After Selim's rejection of the ultimatum, a British squadron under Vice Admiral John Thomas Duckworth entered the Dardanelles on 19 February 1807 and destroyed an Ottoman naval force in the Sea of Marmara, and anchored opposite Constantinople. With French assistance the Ottomans erected powerful batteries and strengthened their fortifications. The British warships were cannonaded suffering the loss of two ships. Duckworth made the decision to withdraw to the Mediterranean on 3 March 1807.

== Alexandria expedition of 1807 ==
On 16 March 1807, 6,000 British troops embarked for Alexandria in Ottoman Egypt, which they captured in August. Governor Muhammad Ali mounted effective counter-attacks and a lack of supplies forced the British to withdraw. The Ottoman Empire had little military support from France due to the war with Russia; Napoleon failed to secure Russia's compliance with the armistice agreement of 1807 with Britain, which was now at war with both France and Russia.

== Aftermath ==
On 5 January 1809, the Treaty of the Dardanelles was concluded aboard a British ship, ending the war. The war resulted in either an Ottoman victory or ended indecisively.
