= Oriental Crisis of 1840 =

Episode in the Egyptian–Ottoman War

- Part of Egyptian–Ottoman War (1839–1841)
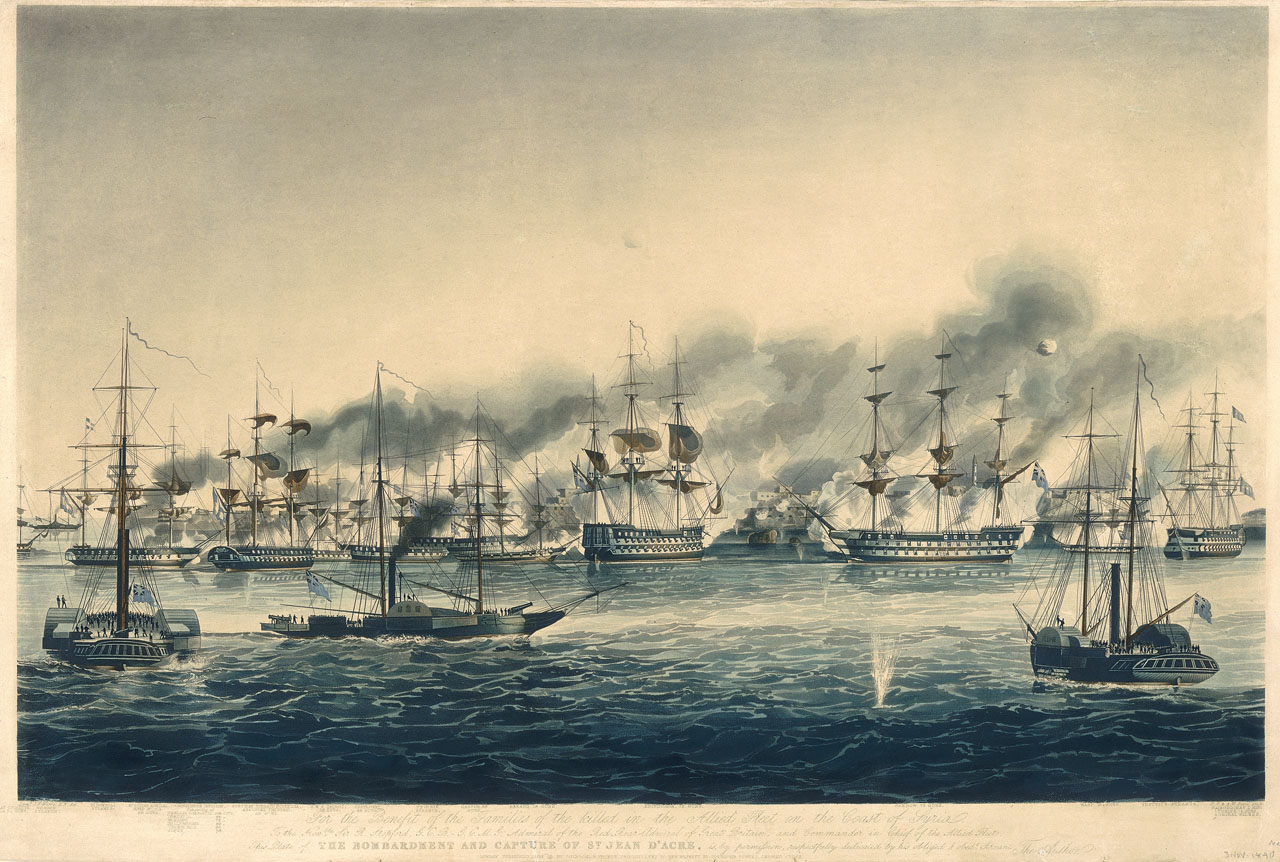
- The bombardment and capture of St Jean d'Acre
Date	Summer–November 1840
Location	Nile Delta, Beirut, Acre
Result	Convention of London enforced by allied powers, and Muhammad Ali Pasha secures his position and future dynasty in Egypt

Belligerents
(United Kingdom of Great Britain and Ireland) United Kingdom; Austrian Empire; Prussia; Russian Empire; Ottoman Empire	(Ottoman Egypt) Egypt Eyalet

Commanders and leaders
(Austrian Empire) Archduke Friedrich (United Kingdom of Great Britain and Ireland) Admiral Robert Stopford: John Ommanney; Henry Codrington; Arthur Fanshawe	(Ottoman Egypt) Muhammad Ali Pasha: Ibrahim Pasha

The Oriental Crisis of 1840 was an episode in the Egyptian–Ottoman War in the eastern Mediterranean, triggered by the self-declared Khedive of Egypt and Sudan Muhammad Ali Pasha's aims to establish a personal empire in Ottoman Egypt.

== Background ==
In the preceding decades, Muhammad Ali had expanded and strengthened his hold on Ottoman territory, beginning with Egypt, where he acted as a viceroy for the Sultan. Called upon to assist the Ottomans in the Greek War of Independence, Muhammad Ali in return demanded parts of Ottoman Syria to be transferred to his personal rule. When the war ended and the Porte failed to keep its promise, Muhammad Ali launched a military campaign against his Ottoman masters and easily took most of the Syrian lands.

=== Syrian War ===
Extent of Muhammad Ali's rule in 1840

In 1839, the Ottoman Empire attempted to retake Syria from Muhammad Ali but was defeated by his son, Ibrahim Pasha in the Battle of Nezib. Thus, a new war between Muhammad Ali and the Ottomans escalated, with the latter failing once again to wage it successfully. In June 1840, the entire Ottoman navy defected to Muhammad Ali, and the French planned to offer full support to his cause.

On the verge of total collapse and defeat to Muhammad Ali, an alliance of European powers comprising Britain, the Austrian Empire, Prussia and Russia decided to intervene on behalf of the young Sultan Abdülmecid I.

== Convention of London ==
By the Convention of London, signed on 15 July 1840, the Great Powers offered Muhammad Ali and his heirs permanent control over Egypt, Sudan, and the southern part of the Damascus Eyalet, if those territories would nominally remain part of the Ottoman Empire. If he did not accept the withdrawal of his forces within ten days, he would lose the offer in Syria. If he delayed acceptance more than 20 days, he would forfeit everything offered. The European powers agreed to use all possible means of persuasion to affect the agreement, but Muhammad Ali hesitated since he believed in support from France.

=== French position ===
The French, under the newly-formed cabinet of Prime Minister Adolphe Thiers, sought to increase French influence in North Africa after their conquest of Algeria. Supporting Muhammad Ali's thus-successful revolt seemed suitable. Counter Admiral Julien Pierre Anne Lalande was dispatched to the Mediterranean to eventually join forces with the defected Ottoman fleet. However, France became politically isolated when the other Great Powers backed up the Sultan, and Thiers was unprepared to bring his country into open war with Britain. France switched sides and aligned against Muhammad Ali in October 1840.

== Military campaign ==
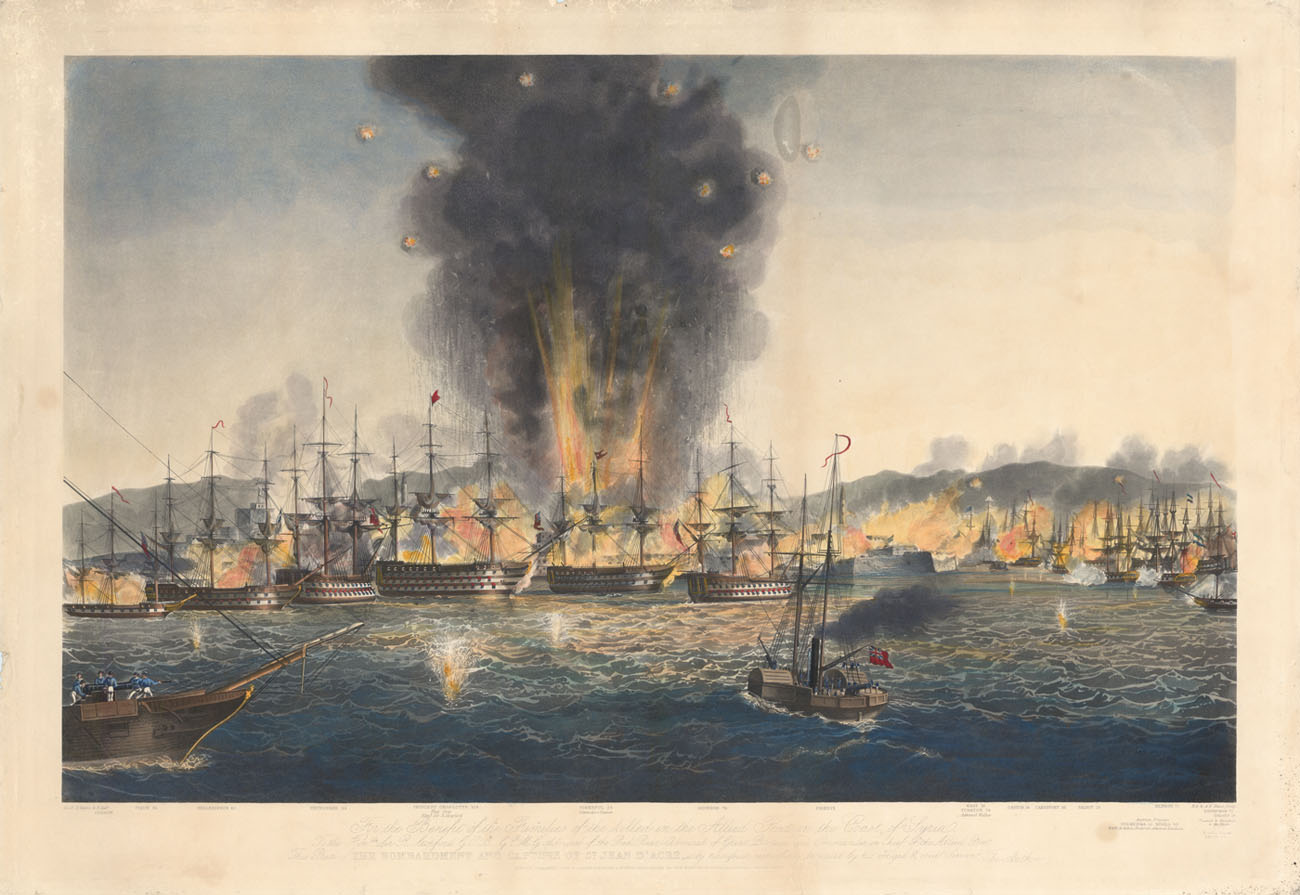
HMS Phoenix (1832) in the bombardment of Acre, 1840

In September 1840, the European powers eventually moved from diplomatic means to military action. When French support for Muhammad Ali failed to materialize, British and Austrian naval forces in the eastern Mediterranean moved against Syria and Alexandria.

Alexandria was the port where the defecting Ottoman fleet had withdrawn. After the Royal Navy and the Austrian Navy first blockaded the Nile Delta coastline, they moved east to shell Sidon and Beirut on 11 September 1840. British and Austrian forces then attacked Acre. Following the bombardment of the city and the port on 3 November 1840 a small landing party of Austrian, British and Ottoman troops, which were led personally by the Austrian fleet commander, Archduke Friedrich, took the citadel after Muhammad Ali's Egyptian garrison in Acre had fled.

== Results ==
After the surrender of Acre, Muhammad Ali finally accepted the terms of the Convention on 27 November 1840. He renounced his claims over Crete and the Hijaz and agreed to downsize his naval forces and his standing army to 18,000 men if he and his descendants would enjoy hereditary rule over Egypt and Sudan, an unheard-of status for an Ottoman viceroy. Indeed, a firman was issued by the sultan and confirmed Muhammad Ali's rule over Egypt and the Sudan. Muhammad Ali withdrew from Syria, the Hijaz, the Holy Land, Adana and Crete and handed back the Ottoman fleet.

== See also ==
- Rhine crisis
- Anglo-Neapolitan Sulphur Crisis
- History of Ottoman Egypt
- History of the Ottoman Empire
- History of Egypt under the Muhammad Ali dynasty
