= London Straits Convention =

1841 treaty on the Turkish Straits

The Bosporus (red), the Dardanelles (yellow), and the Sea of Marmara in between, are known collectively as the Turkish Straits. Modern borders are shown.

In the London Straits Convention concluded on 13 July 1841 between the Great Powers of Europe at the time—Russia, the United Kingdom, France, Austria and Prussia—the "ancient rule" of the Ottoman Empire was re-established by closing the Turkish Straits (the Bosporus and Dardanelles), which link the Black Sea to the Mediterranean, from all warships whatsoever, barring those of the Sultan's allies during wartime. It thus benefited British naval power at the expense of Russia as the latter lacked direct access for its navy to the Mediterranean.

The treaty is one in a series dealing with access to the Bosporus, the Sea of Marmara, and the Dardanelles. It evolved as a reaction to the secret article in the Treaty of Hünkâr İskelesi (Unkiar Skelessi), created in 1833, in which the Ottoman Empire guaranteed exclusive use of the straits to Ottoman and Imperial Russian warships in the case of a general war, allowing no "foreign vessels of war to enter therein under any pretext whatsoever". The modern treaty controlling relations is the Montreux Convention Regarding the Regime of the Straits from 1936, which is still in force.

== Historical background ==
The Straits Convention was an agreement between the major powers to strengthen the Ottoman Empire. It evolved from the earlier Treaty of the Dardanelles, signed between Britain and the Ottomans in 1809.

Beginning in 1831, Egypt, under the leadership of Muhammad Ali of Egypt, was revolting against the Ottoman Empire, resulting in the Egyptian–Ottoman War (1831–33). Russian Tsar, Nicholas I, chose to support the Ottomans. In 1833, Russia sent a naval force and troops to support the Ottoman defence of Constantinople. Britain was likewise supporting the Ottoman Empire.

Nevertheless, Russia was then the Ottomans' principal ally; the two countries signed the Treaty of Hünkâr İskelesi, which reflected this alliance. The Treaty guaranteed that the Ottomans would close the Straits to foreign warships if and when Russia was under threat, and requested this.

== Negotiations ==
Still, the hostility between the Turks and the Egyptians continued in 1839, resulting in the Egyptian–Ottoman War (1839–41). The Egyptians again threatened the Ottoman positions. Lord Palmerston of Britain called for talks with Russia, Austria, and Prussia in London in 1840. This resulted in the Convention of London (1840).

Efforts were made to convince France, which tended to side with Mehmet, to accept a multilateral agreement. This evolved into the Straits Convention of 1841, which included guarantees similar to those of the 1809 Treaty of the Dardanelles, also extending the 1840 Convention of London.

The motivation of Tsar Nicholas I to agree to the closing of the straits has been said to be his uneasiness over the Treaty of Hünkâr İskelesi, which he feared might turn the other Great Powers against Russia by creating too close an alliance between him and the Sultan, Abdülmecid I. He also authorised the British Navy to quell the attack on the Ottoman Empire by its former vassal, Muhammad Ali. However, Anglo-Russian tensions over the region remained, leading eventually to the Crimean War.

== Outcomes ==
From the British point of view, this convention helped preserve the European balance of power by preventing Russia's newly powerful navy from dominating the Mediterranean. From the Russian point of view, the treaty encouraged the aggressive policies of Britain in the region, which would lead to the Crimean War. Different interpretations, as well as history of British-Russian relations in the 1840s, suggest that the Straits Convention 'appeared to establish a new era of harmony' between both powers, keeping Russian navy out of the Mediterranean and British out of the Black Sea.

While these arrangements forced Tsar Nicholas I to abandon his plans for reducing the Ottoman Empire to complete dependence upon Russia and wresting the control of the Christian countries of the Balkans from the Porte, the Ottoman Empire was not wholly independent after the convention, as it relied on Britain and France for protection.

== See also ==
- International waterway
