= Treaty of the Dardanelles =

1809 treaty between the Ottoman Empire and Great Britain

Dardanelles Treaty of Peace, Commerce, and Secret Alliance
- Type: Peace
- Signed: 5 January 1809
- Location: Çanak, Ottoman Empire
- Parties: Ottoman Empire; Great Britain

The Treaty of the Dardanelles (also known as the Dardanelles Treaty of Peace, Commerce, and Secret Alliance, the Treaty of Çanak, the Treaty of Chanak or Turkish: Kale-i Sultaniye Antlaşması) was concluded between the Ottoman Empire and Great Britain on 5 January 1809 at Çanak, Ottoman Empire. The treaty ended the Anglo-Turkish War. The Porte (the Ottoman government) restored extensive British commercial and legal privileges in the empire. Britain promised to protect the integrity of the Ottoman Empire against the French threat, both with its own fleet and through weapons supplies to Constantinople. The treaty affirmed the principle that no warships of any power should enter the straits of the Dardanelles and the Bosporus. The treaty anticipated the London Straits Convention of 1841, by which the other major powers committed themselves to this same principle.
