= Convention of London (1840) =

1840 treaty leading to the Oriental Crisis

- Signed: 15 July 1840
- Location: London, United Kingdom
- Signatories: United Kingdom; Austrian Empire; Prussia; Russian Empire; Ottoman Empire

The Convention of London of 1840 was a treaty with the title of Convention for the Pacification of the Levant, signed on 15 July 1840 between the Great Powers of United Kingdom, Austria, Prussia, Russia on one hand and the Ottoman Empire on the other. The Convention lent some support to the Ottoman Empire, which was having difficulties with the rebellious Wali of Egypt.

Because Muhammad Ali of Egypt did not accept the terms of the convention, the Oriental Crisis of 1840 resulted. Thus, Muhammad Ali finally had to accept the convention on 27 November 1840.

== Negotiations ==
The treaty summarized recent agreements concerning the Ottoman Empire under Abdulmecid I, and its second war with Muhammad Ali's Egypt Eyalet. It was brought about by the Great Powers' fear of the destabilizing effect an Ottoman collapse would have on Europe.

The Ottomans agreed to declare the Dardanelles closed to all non-Ottoman warships in peacetime. Muhammad Ali was to withdraw immediately his forces from Arabia, the holy cities of Mecca and Medina, Crete, and the district of Adana, all within the Ottoman Empire. In return, the signatories offered to Muhammad Ali and his heirs permanent control over Egypt, Sudan and the southern part of the Damascus Eyalet if those territories would remain part of the Ottoman Empire. If he did not agree to withdrawal of his forces within ten days, he should lose the offer in Southern Syria; if he delayed acceptance more than 20 days, he should forfeit everything offered. He also had to return the Ottoman fleet that had defected to Egypt and was in Alexandria.

== Oriental Crisis of 1840 ==
The European powers agreed to use all possible means of persuasion to effect this agreement, but Muhammad Ali, backed by France, refused to accept its terms in the time given. That led to the Oriental Crisis of 1840, and British and Austrian forces attacked Acre, defeating his troops late in 1840. Muhammad Ali's forces faced increasing military pressure from Europe and the Ottoman Empire, fought a losing battle against insurgents in its captured territories, and saw the general deterioration of its military from the strain of the recent wars.

Muhammad Ali finally accepted the terms of the Convention and the firmans subsequently issued by the sultan, confirming his rule over Egypt and the Sudan. He withdrew from Syria and Crete and sent back the Ottoman fleet. The London Convention and the firmans were the legal basis for Egypt's status as an autonomous Ottoman province. Later Egyptian nationalists cited them to discredit claims for the British occupation.

== See also ==
- London Straits Convention (1841)
- History of Ottoman Egypt
- History of Egypt under the Muhammad Ali dynasty
