= International Straits Commission =

The flag used by the International Straits Commission until the Montreux Convention.

The Turkish Straits: Bosphorus Strait Dardanelles Strait

The International Straits Commission was an international agency that, under the auspices of the League of Nations, managed the Turkish Straits (the Dardanelles and Bosphorus) from 1923 to 1936. The commission, chaired by Lord Curzon, first met on 4 December 1922. It had representatives from France, Great Britain, Italy, Japan, Bulgaria, Greece, Romania, the Soviet Union and Yugoslavia.

In the aftermath of World War I and the 1920 Treaty of Sèvres, the Straits were demilitarized and internationalized. In 1923 the Treaty of Lausanne revised the terms of Sevres, and restored Turkish sovereignty, but the Straits remained open to unrestricted civilian and military traffic, under the auspices of the International Straits Commission, headed by a Turkish national. This status remained until the 1936 Montreux Convention Regarding the Regime of the Straits, which abolished the Commission and gave full control to Turkey, which was allowed to remilitarize the Straits and forbid traffic to belligerent countries, while restrictions were placed on the passage of warships.
