= Kilitbahir Castle =

Fortification on the Dardanelles, Turkey

Coordinates: 40.147656°N 26.379565°E

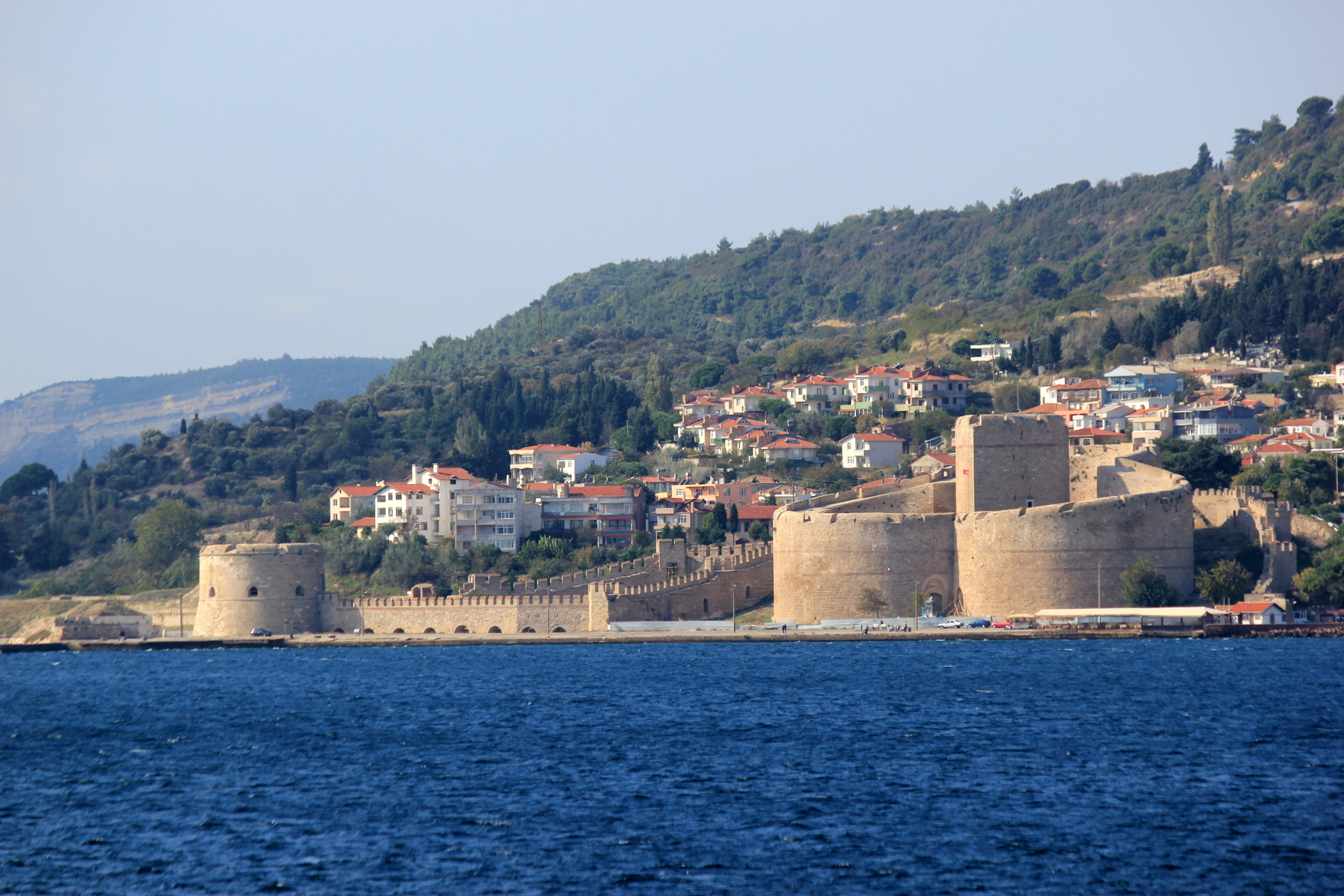
Kilitbahir Castle

Kilitbahir Castle (Turkish: Kilitbahir Kalesi) is a fortress on the west side of the Dardanelles, opposite the city of Çanakkale, where there is a corresponding fortress (Kale-i Sultaniye), from which Çanakkale takes its name. The two castles were constructed by Fatih Sultan Mehmet in 1463 to control the straits at their narrowest point. Kilitbahir's name, meaning "lock of the sea", reflects this defensive purpose. Due to the protracted siege against Candia, the castle and Kale-i Sultaniye were repaired in order to fortify the Dardanelles.

== Gallery ==
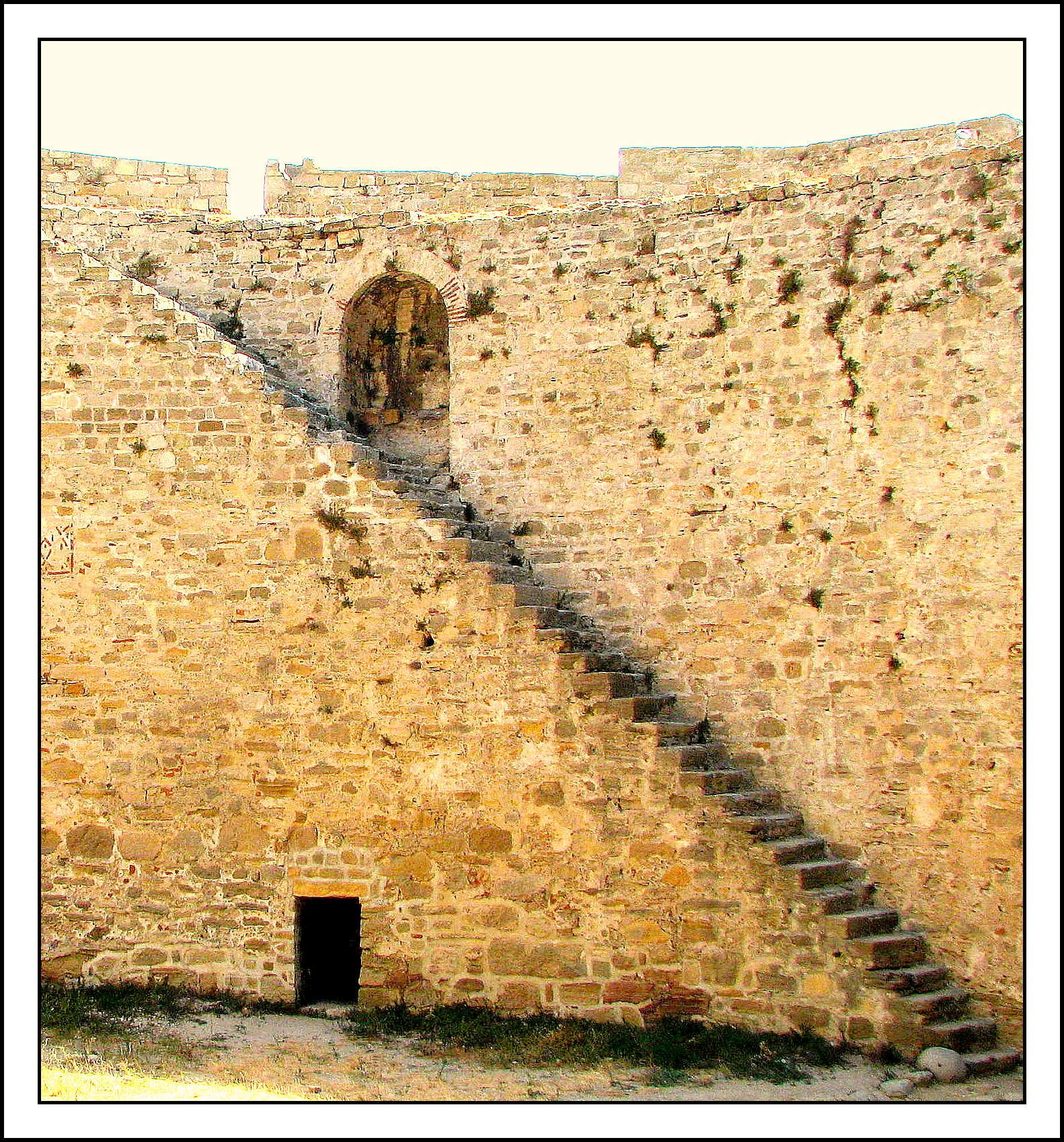

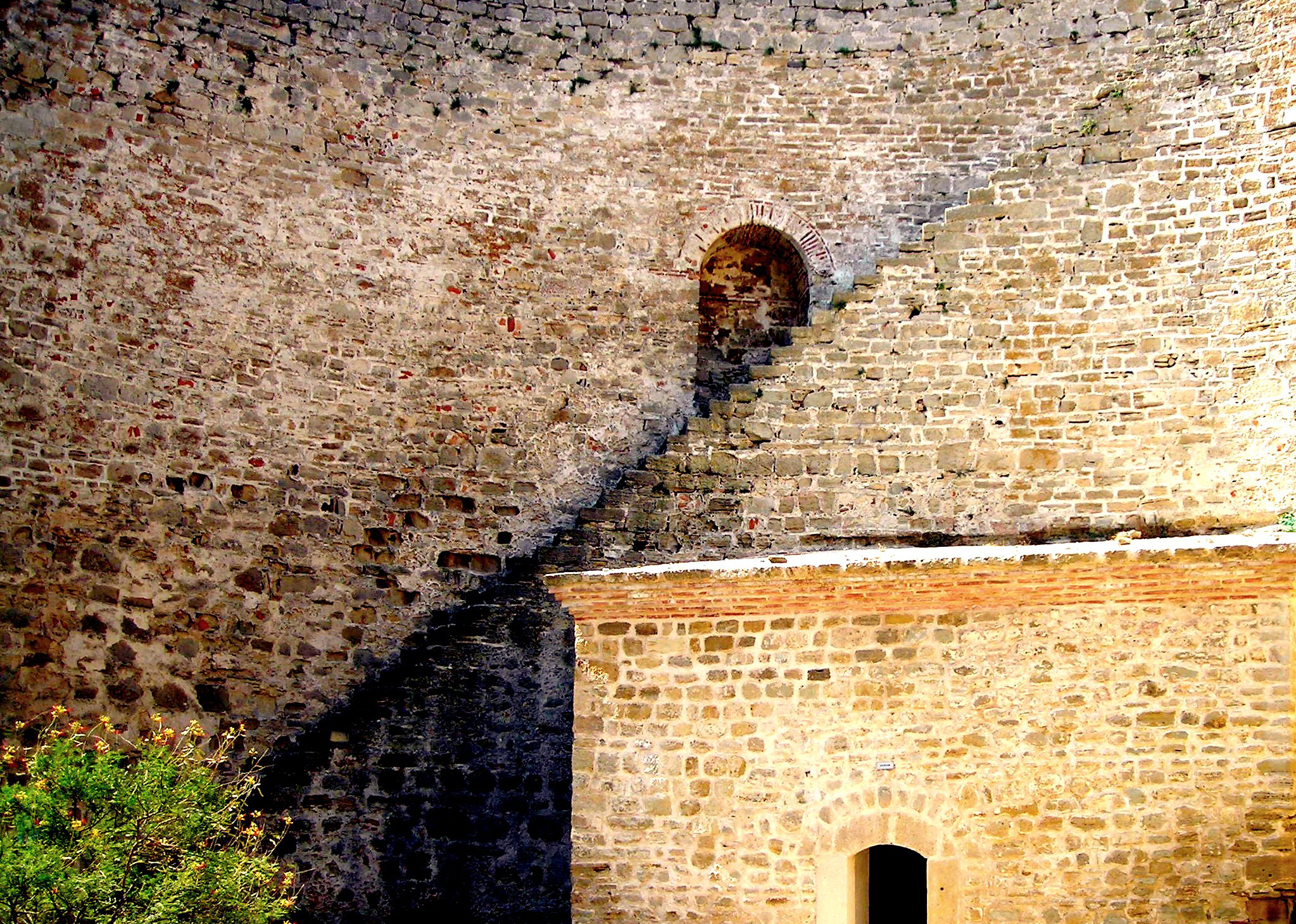

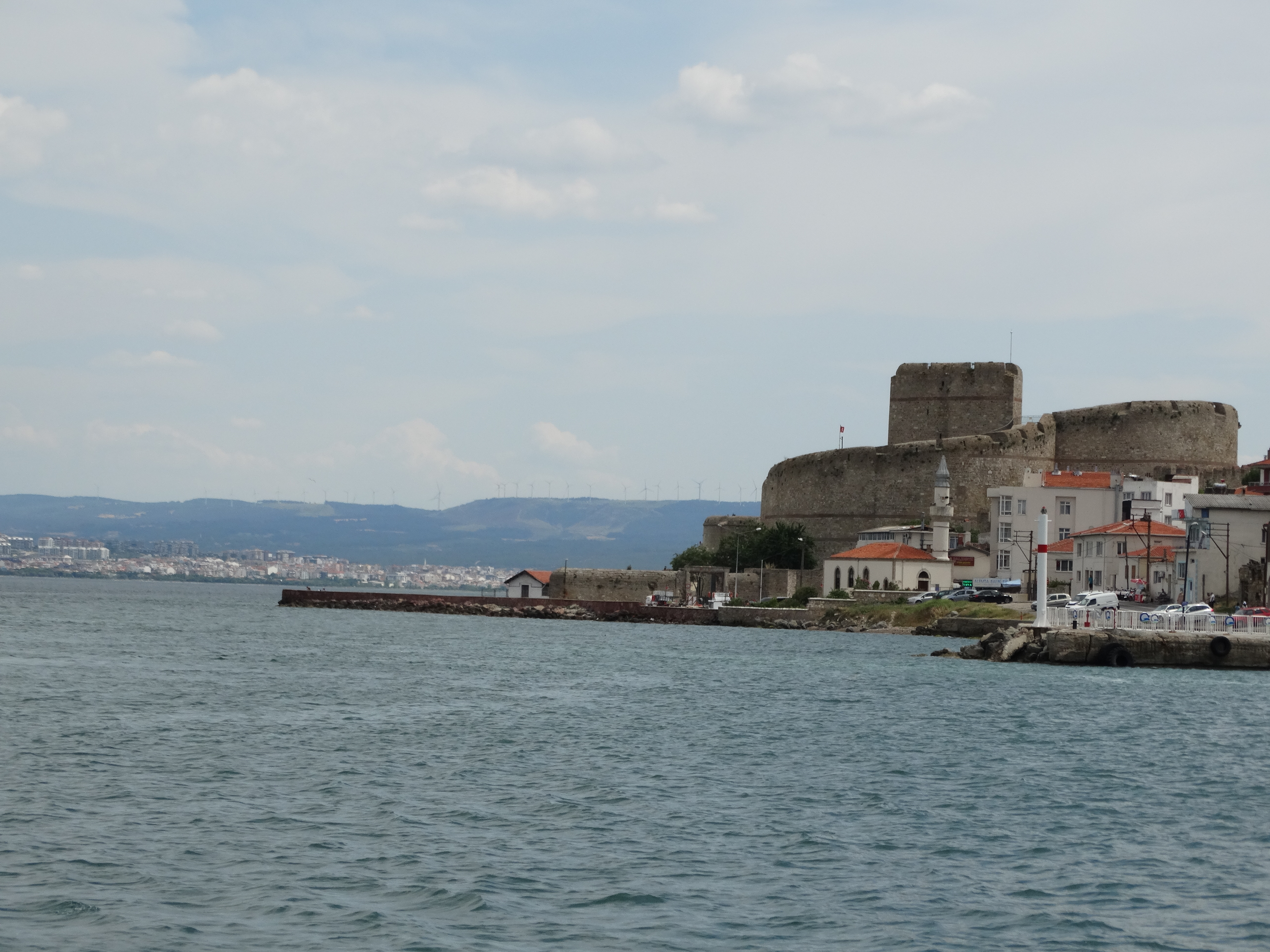
