= Montreux Convention Regarding the Regime of the Straits =

1936 treaty governing the Bosporus and Dardanelles straits

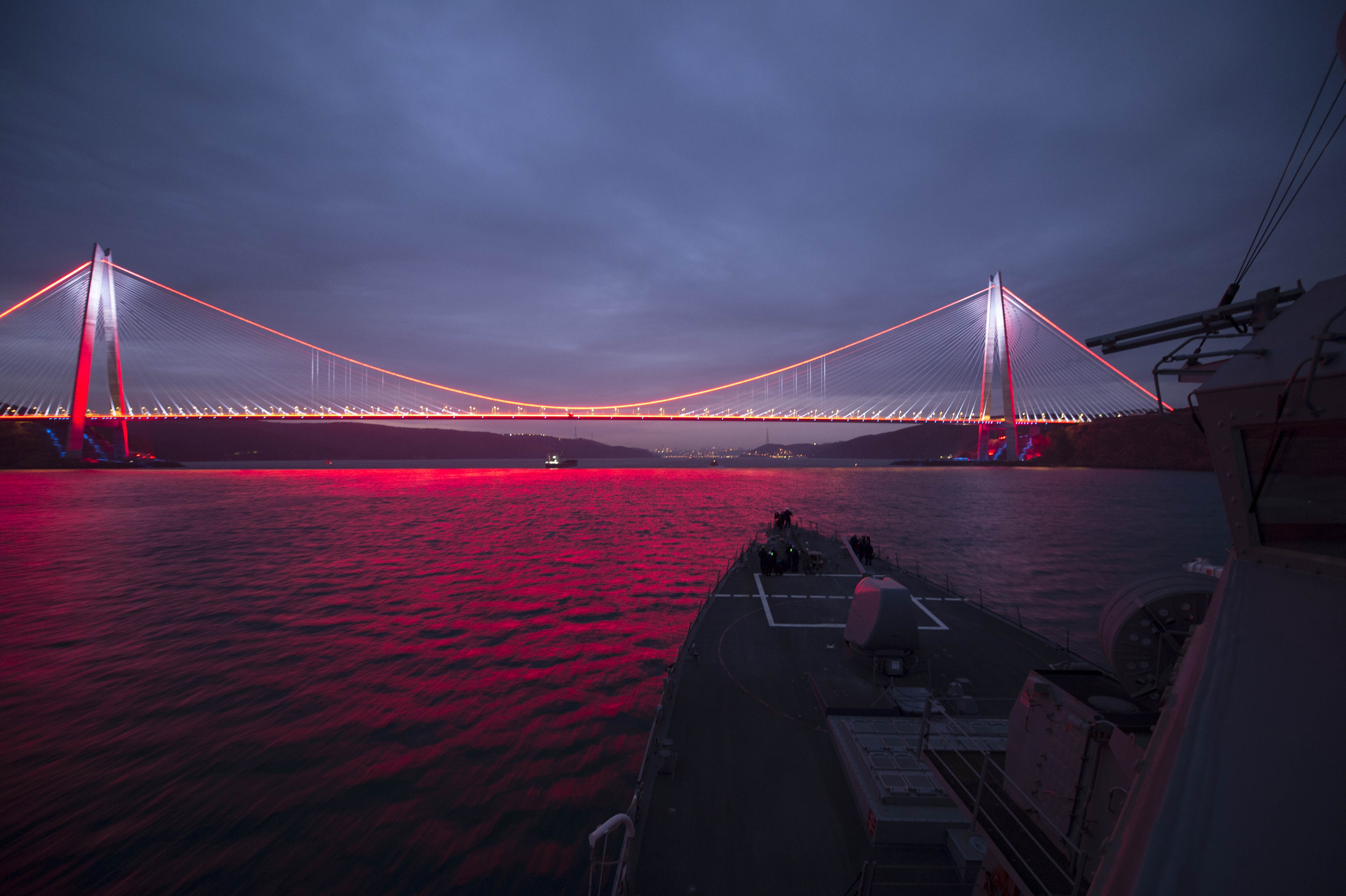
- The Yavuz Sultan Selim Bridge on the Bosporus strait
- Signed: 20 July 1936
- Location: Montreux, Switzerland
- Effective: 9 November 1936
- Original signatories: Australia; Bulgaria; France; Greece; Japan; Romania; Yugoslavia; Turkey; United Kingdom; Soviet Union
- Language: French

Full text
- Montreux Convention at Wikisource

The (Montreux) Convention regarding the Regime of the Straits, often known simply as the Montreux Convention, is an international agreement governing the Bosporus and Dardanelles straits in Turkey. Signed on 20 July 1936 at the Montreux Palace in Switzerland, it went into effect on 9 November 1936, addressing the long running Straits Question over who should control the strategically vital link between the Black and Mediterranean seas.

The Montreux Convention regulates maritime traffic through the Bosporus and Dardanelles straits in Turkey. It guarantees "complete freedom" of passage for all civilian vessels in times of peace. In peacetime, military vessels are limited in number, tonnage and weaponry, with specific provisions governing their mode of entry and duration of stay. If they want to pass through the Strait, warships must provide advance notification to the Turkish authorities, which, in turn, must inform the parties to the convention. (Note: Defined as warships displacing more than 100 tons but not above 10,000 tons.) In wartime, if Turkey is not involved in the conflict, warships of the nations at war may not pass through the Straits, except when returning to their base. When Turkey is at war, or feels threatened by a war, it may take any decision about the passage of warships as it sees fit.

While it was designed for a particular geopolitical context, and remains unchanged since its adoption, the Montreux Convention has endured as a "solid example of a rules-based international order", since most of its terms are still followed.

== Background ==
Bosporus Strait Dardanelles Strait

The convention was one of a series of agreements in the 19th and 20th centuries that sought to address the long-running Straits Question of who should control the strategically vital link between the Black Sea and Mediterranean Sea. In 1923, the Treaty of Lausanne had demilitarised the Dardanelles and opened the Straits to unrestricted civilian and military traffic under the supervision of the International Straits Commission of the League of Nations.

By the late 1930s, the strategic situation in the Mediterranean had altered with the rise of Fascist Italy, which controlled the Greek-inhabited Dodecanese islands off the west coast of Turkey and had constructed fortifications on Rhodes, Leros and Kos. The Turks feared that Italy would seek to exploit access to the Straits to expand its power into Anatolia and the Black Sea region. There were also fears of Bulgarian rearmament. Although Turkey was not legally permitted to refortify the Straits, it nonetheless did so secretly.

In April 1935, the Turkish government dispatched a lengthy diplomatic note to the signatories of the Treaty of Lausanne proposing a conference to agree a new regime for the Straits and requested that the League of Nations authorise the reconstruction of the Dardanelles forts. In the note, Turkish Foreign Minister Tevfik Rüştü Aras explained that the international situation had changed greatly since 1923. Europe had then been moving towards disarmament and an international guarantee to defend the Straits. The Abyssinia Crisis of 1934–1935, the denunciation by Germany of the Treaty of Versailles and international moves towards rearmament meant that "the only guarantee intended to guard against the total insecurity of the Straits has just disappeared in its turn". Indeed, Aras said that "the Powers most closely concerned are proclaiming the existence of a threat of general conflagration". The key weaknesses of the present regime were that the machinery for collective guarantees were too slow and ineffective, and there was no contingency for a general threat of war and no provision for Turkey to defend itself. Turkey was therefore prepared to enter into negotiations with a view to concluding, in the near future, agreements for regulation of the Straits with essential security provisions for the inviolability of Turkey's territory, and also for continued development of commercial navigation between the Mediterranean and the Black Sea.

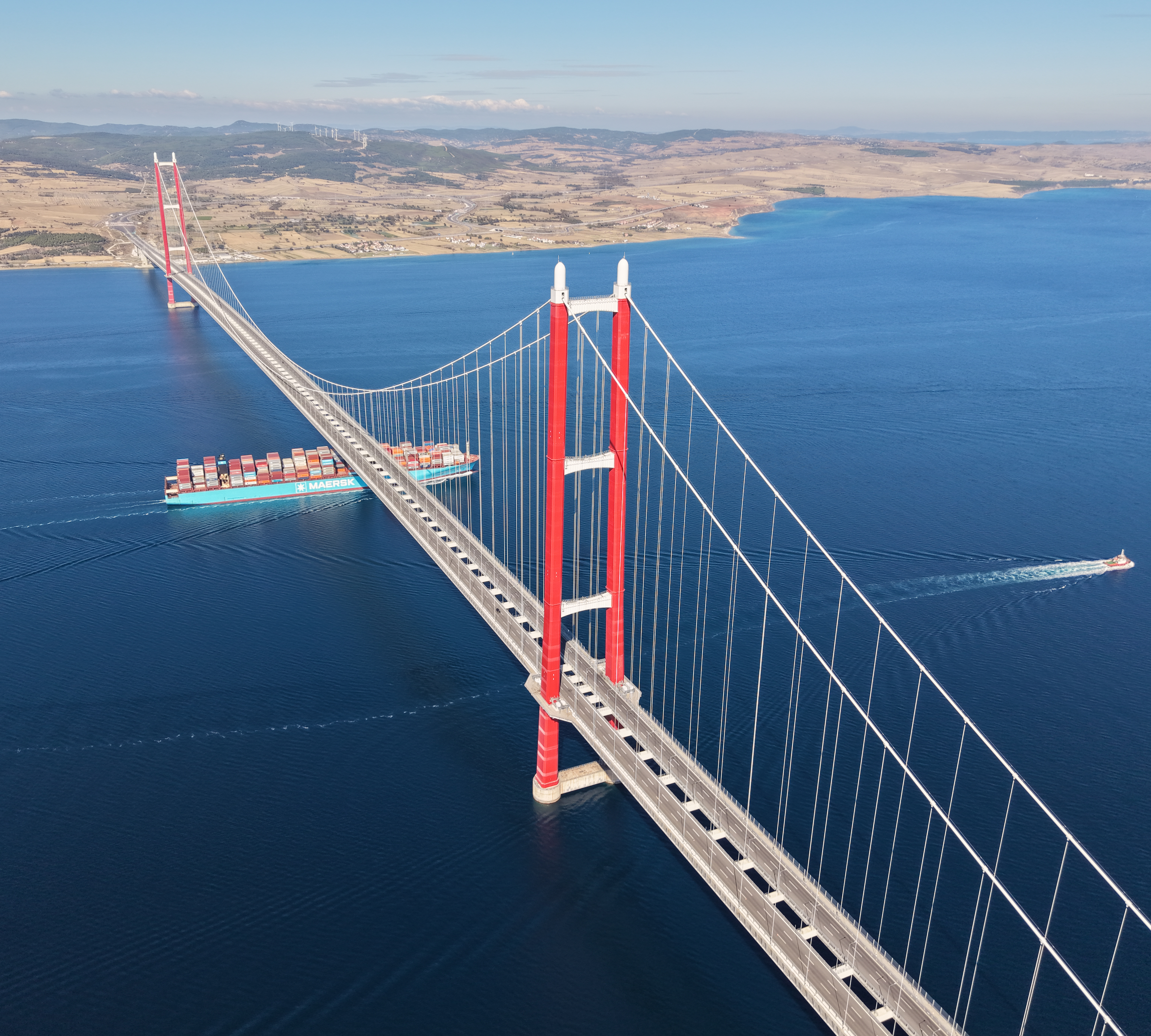
The 1915 Çanakkale Bridge on the Dardanelles strait, connecting Europe and Asia, is the longest suspension bridge in the world.

The response to the note was generally favourable; Australia, Bulgaria, France, Germany, Greece, Japan, Romania, the Soviet Union, Turkey, the United Kingdom and Yugoslavia attended negotiations at Montreux, Switzerland, which began on 22 June 1936. Two major powers were notably absent: Italy, whose aggressively expansionist policies had prompted the conference, refused to attend, and the increasingly isolationist United States declined even to send an observer.

Turkey, the United Kingdom and the Soviet Union each put forward their own set of proposals, each aimed chiefly at protecting the proponent's own interests. The British favoured the continuation of a relatively restrictive approach, the Turks sought a more liberal regime that reasserted their control over the Straits, and the Soviets proposed a regime that would guarantee absolute freedom of passage. The British, supported by France, sought to exclude the Soviet fleet from the Mediterranean Sea, where it might threaten the vital shipping lanes to India, Egypt and the Far East. In the end, the British conceded some of their requests, but the Soviets succeeded in ensuring that the Black Sea countries, including the Soviet Union, were given exemptions from the military restrictions imposed on non-Black Sea nations. The agreement was ratified by all of the conference attendees with the exception of Germany, which had not been a signatory to the Treaty of Lausanne, and with reservations by Japan, and came into force on 9 November 1936; it was registered with the League of Nations Treaty Series on 11 December 1936.

Britain's willingness to make concessions has been attributed to a desire to avoid Turkey being driven to ally itself with or to fall under the influence of Adolf Hitler or Benito Mussolini. It was thus the first in a series of steps by Britain and France to ensure that Turkey would either remain neutral or tilt towards the Western Allies in the event of any future conflict with the Axis.

== Terms ==
As mentioned in its preamble, the Convention replaced the terms of the Lausanne Treaty of 1923 regarding the Straits. This had dictated the demilitarisation of the Greek islands of Lemnos and Samothrace, along with the demilitarisation of the Sea of Marmara and the Bosporus, the Dardanelles, and the Turkish islands of İmroz, Bozcaada and Tavşan.

The Convention consists of 29 Articles, four annexes and one protocol. Articles 2–7 consider the passage of merchant ships. Articles 8–22 consider the passage of war vessels. The key principle – freedom of passage and navigation – is laid out in articles 1 and 2. Article 1 provides, "The High Contracting Parties recognise and affirm the principle of freedom of passage and navigation by sea in the Straits". Article 2 states, "In time of peace, merchant vessels shall enjoy complete freedom of passage and navigation in the Straits, by day and by night, under any flag with any kind of cargo".

The International Straits Commission was abolished, thereby allowing the full resumption of Turkish military control over the Straits and the refortification of the Dardanelles. Turkey was authorised to close the Straits to all foreign warships during a war or when it was threatened by aggression. Also, Turkey was authorised to refuse transit from merchant ships belonging to countries at war with it.

A number of highly specific restrictions in Article 14 and 18 were imposed on what type of warships are allowed passage. Non-Black Sea powers wishing to send a vessel must notify Turkey 15 days prior to the requested passing, and Black Sea states must notify 8 days prior to passage. Also, no more than nine foreign warships, with a total aggregate tonnage of 15,000 tons, may pass at any one time. Furthermore, no single ship heavier than 10,000 tonnes can pass. An aggregate tonnage of all non-Black Sea warships in the Black Sea must be no more than 45,000 tons, with no one nation exceeding 30,000 tons at any given time, and they are permitted to stay in the Black Sea for at most 21 days. Only Black Sea states may transit capital ships of any tonnage, escorted by no more than two destroyers. Any revision to articles 14 and 18 requires 3/4 majority of signatory countries and must include Turkey.

Under Article 12, Black Sea states are also allowed to send submarines through the Straits with prior notice as long as the vessels have been constructed, purchased or sent for repair outside the Black Sea. The less restrictive rules applicable to Black Sea states were agreed as effectively a concession to the Soviet Union, the only Black Sea state other than Turkey with any significant number of capital ships or submarines. The passage of civil aircraft between the Mediterranean and the Black seas is permitted only along routes authorised by the Turkish government.

Under article 19, warships of countries at war are forbidden passage, except to return to their base.

== Implementation ==
The terms of the convention were largely a reflection of the international situation in the mid-1930s. They largely served Turkish and Soviet interests by enabling Turkey to regain military control of the Straits and assuring Soviet dominance of the Black Sea. Although the Convention restricted the Soviets' ability to send naval forces into the Mediterranean Sea – satisfying British concerns about Soviet intrusion into what was considered a British sphere of influence – it also ensured that outside powers could not exploit the Straits to threaten the Soviet Union.

=== World War II ===
This feature was to have significant repercussions during World War II; the Montreux regime prevented the Axis powers from sending naval forces through the Straits to attack the Soviet Union. The Axis powers, thereby, were severely limited in naval capability for their Black Sea campaigns, relying principally on small vessels transported overland by rail and canal networks. Six U-boats of the German 30th U-boat Flotilla reached the Black Sea in 1942 after a transport from North Sea via Elbe, over land and the Danube to be operated from the harbours of Constanţa and Feodosiya from 1942 to 1944.

Auxiliary vessels and armed merchant ships comprised a grey area, though, and the transit of such Axis vessels through the straits led to friction between the Allies and Turkey. After a number of German auxiliary ships had been permitted to transit the Straits, repeated protests from Moscow and London prompted the Turkish government to ban passage of "suspicious" Axis ships from June 1944.

=== Aircraft carriers ===
Although the Montreux Convention is cited by the Turkish government as prohibiting aircraft carriers from transiting the Straits, the treaty actually contains no explicit prohibition on aircraft carriers. However, modern aircraft carriers are heavier than the 15,000-ton limit imposed on warships, which makes it impossible for non–Black Sea powers to transit modern aircraft carriers through the Straits.

Under Article 11, Black Sea states are permitted to transit capital ships of any tonnage through the straits, but Annex II specifically excludes aircraft carriers from the definition of capital ship. In 1936, it was common for battleships to carry observation aircraft. Therefore, aircraft carriers were defined as ships that were "designed or adapted primarily for the purpose of carrying and operating aircraft at sea". The inclusion of aircraft on any other ship does not classify it as an aircraft carrier.

The Soviet Union designated its Kiev-class and Kuznetsov-class ships as "aircraft-carrying cruisers" because the ships were armed with P-500 and P-700 cruise missiles, which also form the main armament of the Slava-class cruiser and the Kirov-class battlecruiser. The result was that the Soviet Navy could send its aircraft-carrying cruisers through the Straits in compliance with the convention, but at the same time, the Convention denied access to NATO aircraft carriers, which exceeded the 15,000-ton limit. While the Soviet Union built its aircraft-carrying cruisers in the Black Sea, neither the Soviet Union nor Russia has ever based them in the Black Sea.

Turkey chose to accept the designation of the Soviet aircraft carrying cruisers as aircraft cruisers, as any revision of the convention could leave Turkey with less control over the Straits, and the UN Convention on the Law of the Sea had already established a more liberal passage through other straits. By allowing the Soviet aircraft-carrying cruisers to transit the Straits, Turkey could leave the more restrictive Montreux Convention in place.

== Controversies ==
=== Istanbul Canal ===
If it comes to fruition, the long-proposed Istanbul Canal (Kanal Istanbul) project could, according to Turkey, circumvent the Montreux Convention in the 21st century and allow greater Turkish autonomy with respect to the passage of military ships, which are limited in number, tonnage, and weaponry, from the Black Sea to the Sea of Marmara. The canal project would involve building a 45 km (28 mi) artificial waterway through Thrace to connect the Sea of Marmara with the Black Sea. That route would run nearly parallel to the Bosporus, but ships transiting it would arguably not be subject to the terms of the Montreux Convention. Currently, the Dardanelles is heavily congested with shipping and there are long waits to pass through the Bosporus. The Canal project's stated purposes are to speed up shipping and boost revenue by providing another maritime route.

In January 2018, the Turkish Prime Minister and a former Transport Minister, Binali Yıldırım, announced that the Canal would not be subject to the terms of the Montreux Convention. That announcement was received negatively by the Russian media and government, and many have disputed the Turkish government's interpretation of the convention.

=== Soviet Union ===
The convention was repeatedly challenged by the Soviet Union during World War II and the Cold War. As early as 1939, Joseph Stalin sought to reopen the Straits Question and proposed joint Turkish and Soviet control of the Straits, complaining that "a small state [Turkey] supported by Great Britain held a great state by the throat and gave it no outlet". After the Molotov–Ribbentrop Pact was signed by the Soviet Union and Nazi Germany, Soviet Foreign Minister Vyacheslav Molotov informed his German counterparts that the Soviet Union wished to take military control of the Straits and to establish its own military base there.

The Soviets returned to the issue in 1945 and 1946, demanding a revision of the Montreux Convention at a conference excluding most of its signatories; their demands included a permanent Soviet military presence and joint control of the Straits. These demands were firmly rejected by Turkey, despite an ongoing Soviet "strategy of tension". For several years after World War II, the Soviets exploited the restriction on the number of foreign warships by ensuring that one of theirs was always in the Straits, thus effectively blocking any state other than Turkey from sending warships through the Straits. Soviet pressure expanded into a full demand to revise the Montreux Convention, which led to the 1946 Turkish Straits crisis and Turkey abandoning its policy of neutrality. In 1947, Turkey became the recipient of US military and economic assistance under the Truman Doctrine of containment and joined NATO along with Greece, in 1952.

=== United States ===
The United States has not signed the convention but has generally complied with it. The passage of US warships through the Straits has also raised controversy, as the convention forbids the transit of non-Black Sea nations' warships with guns of a calibre larger than eight inches (200 mm). In the 1960s, the US sent warships carrying 420 mm calibre ASROC missiles through the Straits, prompting Soviet protests. The Turkish government rejected Soviet complaints, pointing out that guided missiles were not guns and that, since such weapons had not existed at the time of the convention, they were not restricted.

According to Jason Ditz of Antiwar.com, the Montreux Convention is an obstacle to a US naval buildup in the Black Sea because of the stipulations regulating warship traffic by nations not sharing a Black Sea coastline. The US thinktank Stratfor has suggested that those stipulations place Turkey's relationship to the US and its obligations as a NATO member in conflict with Russia and the regulations of the Montreux Convention.

=== Militarisation of Greek islands ===
The Convention annulled the terms of the earlier Lausanne Treaty on the Straits, including the demilitarisation of the Greek islands of Lemnos and Samothrace. Turkey recognised Greece's right to militarise them via a letter sent to the Greek Prime Minister on 6 May 1936 by the Turkish Ambassador in Athens, Ruşen Eşref. The Turkish government reiterated this position when the Turkish Minister for Foreign Affairs, Rüştu Aras, in his address to the Turkish National Assembly on the occasion of the ratification of the Montreux Treaty, recognised Greece's legal right to deploy troops on Lemnos and Samothrace with the following statement: "The provisions pertaining to the islands of Lemnos and Samothrace, which belong to our neighbour and friendly country Greece and were demilitarised in application of the 1923 Lausanne Treaty, were also abolished by the new Montreux Treaty, which gives us great pleasure".

As the relationship between Greece and Turkey deteriorated over the following decades, Turkey denied that the treaty affected the Greek islands and sought to bring back into force the relevant part of the Lausanne Treaty on the Straits.

=== 1994 reforms ===
The United Nations Convention on the Law of the Sea (UNCLOS), which entered into force in November 1994, has prompted calls for the Montreux Convention to be revised and adapted to make it compatible with UNCLOS's regime governing straits used for international navigation. However, Turkey's longstanding refusal to sign UNCLOS has meant that Montreux remains in force without further amendments. Furthermore, even if Turkey ratified UNCLOS, the Montreux Convention would continue to govern passage in the Straits given its status as a "long-standing international convention" under Article 35(c) of UNCLOS.

The safety of vessels passing through the Bosporus has become more of a concern in recent years as the volume of traffic has increased greatly since the convention was signed: from 4,500 ships passing through in 1934 to 49,304 by 1998. As well as the obvious environmental concerns, the Straits bisect the city of Istanbul, with over 14 million people living on its shores, and so maritime incidents in the Straits pose a considerable risk to public safety. The Convention does not, however, make any provision for the regulation of shipping for the purposes of safety or environmental protection. In January 1994, the Turkish government adopted new "Maritime Traffic Regulations for the Turkish Straits and the Marmara Region" to introduce a new regulatory regime "to ensure the safety of navigation, life and property and to protect the environment in the region" but without violating the Montreux principle of free passage. The new regulations provoked controversy when Russia, Greece, Cyprus, Romania, Ukraine and Bulgaria raised objections. However, they were approved by the International Maritime Organisation on the grounds that they were not intended to prejudice "the rights of any ship using the Straits under international law". The regulations were revised in November 1998 to address Russian concerns.

=== Russo-Ukrainian War ===
After the Russian invasion of Ukraine on 24 February 2022, the Ukrainian government appealed to Turkey to exercise its authority under the Montreux Convention to limit the transit of Russian warships from the Mediterranean to the Black Sea. At least six Russian warships and a submarine had crossed the Turkish straits in February. After initial reluctance, attributed to the country's close ties with both Russia and Ukraine, Turkish Foreign Minister Mevlüt Çavuşoğlu announced on 27 February that his government would legally recognise the Russian invasion as a "war", which provides grounds for implementing the convention with respect to military vessels. This blockage of naval vessels also applies to NATO powers who cannot now move their vessels from the Mediterranean to the Black Sea. However, Çavuşoğlu reiterated that pursuant to the terms of the agreement, Turkey cannot block Russian warships based in the Black Sea from returning to their registered base. Around 27–28 February, Turkey refused permission for three out of four Russian warships to enter the Black Sea as their home base was not on the Black Sea.

Up until 2022, Russia had deployed its Kilo-class submarines from the Black Sea to the Mediterranean, arguing that these vessels were ultimately destined for "maintenance" at facilities in the Baltic Sea. There was criticism of this since the submarines would then remain deployed in the Mediterranean for an extensive period of time. Since this was becoming more difficult to justify, one analysis in May 2022 suggested that the Russians may have found a work-around to the problem, potentially using the country's internal waterways to permit transit to vessels up to the size of the Kilo-class boats between the Black Sea and the Baltic. The ability to use the internal waterways to facilitate such a transit has yet to be confirmed.

Two Russian Federation ships (the missile cruiser Varyag, the flagship of the Russian Pacific Fleet, and Admiral Tributs, a large anti-submarine destroyer) waited in the Mediterranean seeking to enter the Black Sea for nine months. In October 2022, they were refused permission and left the Mediterranean Sea through the Suez Canal.

On 2 January 2024 Turkey refused passage through the strait to two minehunters donated by the British Royal Navy to the Ukrainian Navy pursuant to the Convention.

== General and cited sources ==
- "Convention Regarding the Regime of the Straits Signed at Montreux" (PDF). Başkent University – Strategic Studies Implementation and Research Centre. July 20, 1936. Archived from the original (PDF) on 2020-03-19.
- Berlinski, Claire (November 24, 2008). "The timebomb in the heart of Istanbul". The Week. Future plc. Archived from the original on 2015-12-11.
- De Luca, Anthony R. (1973). The Montreux Conference of 1936: a diplomatic study of Anglo-Soviet rivalry at the Turkish straits. Stanford University. OCLC 1087028359.
- Ünlü, Nihan (2002). The Legal Regime of the Turkish Straits. Martinus Nijhoff Publishers. ISBN 9789004481343.
- Yücel, Kurtuluş (2019). The Legal Regime of the Turkish Straits: Regulation of the Montreux Convention and its Importance on the International Relations after the Conflict of Ukraine (Ph.D.). Johann Wolfgang Goethe-University Frankfurt am Main.
