= Turkish Straits =

Two waterways in Turkey

Coordinates: 40.7225°N 28.2250°E

A map depicting the locations of the straits, with the Bosporus in red, and the Dardanelles in yellow. The sovereign national territory of Turkey is highlighted in green.

The Bosphorus (red), the Dardanelles (yellow), and the Sea of Marmara in between, are known collectively as the Turkish straits

The Turkish Straits (Turkish: Türk Boğazları) are two internationally significant waterways in northwestern Turkey. The Straits create a series of international passages that connect the Aegean and Mediterranean seas to the Black Sea. They consist of the Dardanelles and the Bosphorus. The straits are on opposite ends of the Sea of Marmara. The straits and the Sea of Marmara are part of the sovereign sea territory of Turkey and are treated as Turkish internal waters.

Located in the western part of the landmass of Eurasia, the Straits are conventionally considered the boundary between the continents of Europe and Asia, as well as the dividing line between European Turkey and Asian Turkey. Owing to their strategic importance in international commerce, politics, and warfare, the Straits have played a significant role in European and world history. Since 1936, they have been governed in accordance with the Montreux Convention.

== Geography ==
As maritime waterways, the Turkish Straits connect various seas along the Eastern Mediterranean, the Balkans, and West Asia. Specifically, the Straits allows maritime connections from the Black Sea all the way to the Aegean and Mediterranean Seas, the Atlantic Ocean via Gibraltar, and the Indian Ocean through the Suez Canal, making them crucial international waterways, in particular for the passage of goods coming in from Russia.

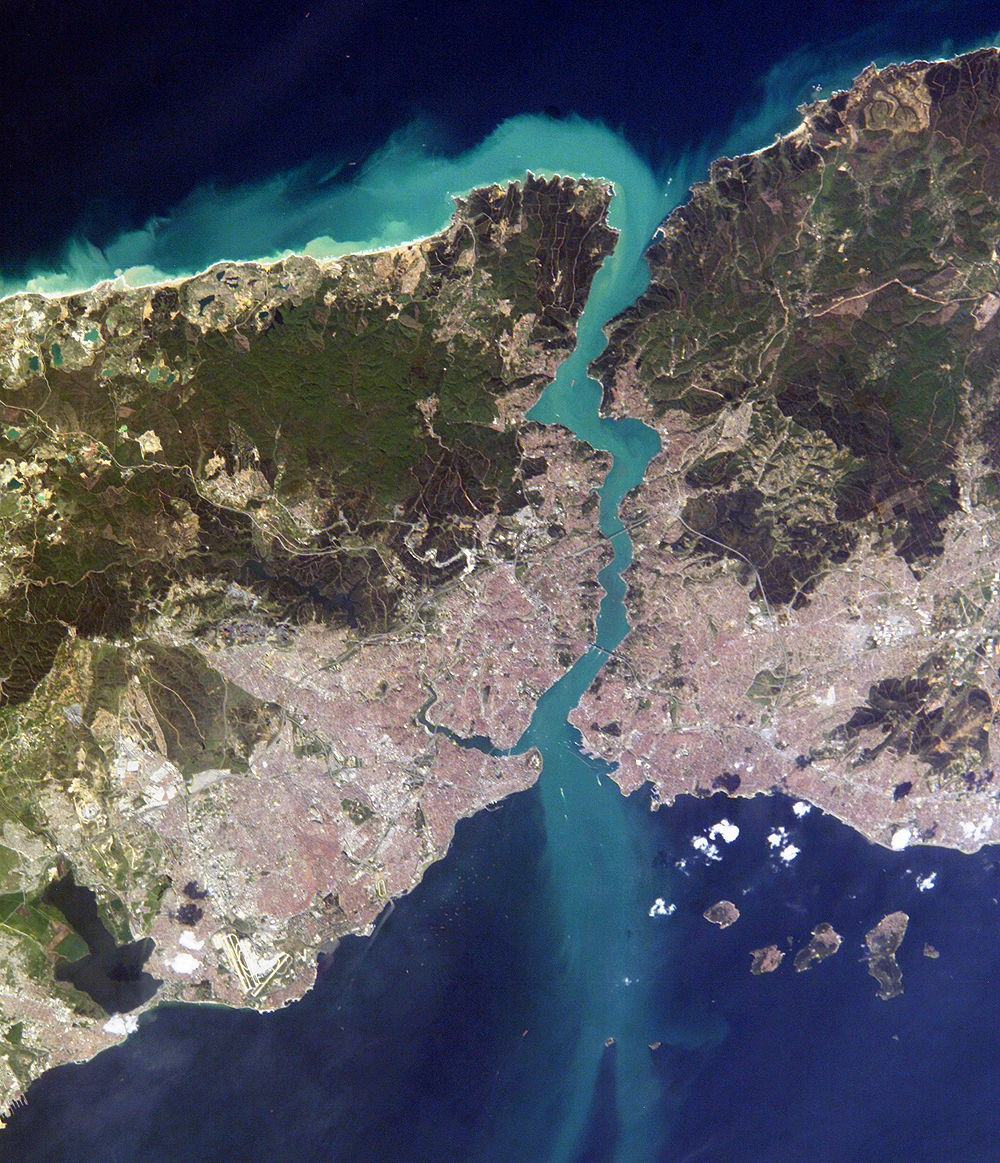
Satellite image of the Bosphorus, taken from the International Space Station in April 2004. The body of water at the top is the Black Sea, the one at the bottom is the Sea of Marmara, and the Bosphorus is the winding vertical waterway that connects the two. The western banks of the Bosphorus constitute the geographic starting point of the European continent, while the banks to the east are the geographic beginnings of the continent of Asia. The city of Istanbul is visible along both banks.

The Turkish Straits are made up of the following waterways;

- The Bosphorus (also spelled Bosporus; Turkish: Boğaziçi or İstanbul Boğazı, "Istanbul Strait"), about 30 kilometers (19 mi) long and only 700 meters (2,300 ft) wide, connects the Sea of Marmara with the Black Sea in the north. It runs through the city of Istanbul, making it a city located on two continents. It is crossed by three suspension bridges (the Bosphorus Bridge, the Fatih Sultan Mehmet Bridge and the Yavuz Sultan Selim Bridge), and two underwater tunnels (the Marmaray rail tunnel and the Eurasia road tunnel). There are plans for further crossings being debated at various stages.
- The Dardanelles (Turkish: Çanakkale Boğazı, "Çanakkale Strait"), 68 km (42 mi) long and 1.2 km (0.75 mi) wide, connects the Sea of Marmara with the Mediterranean in the southwest, near the city of Çanakkale. In classical antiquity, the Dardanelles strait was known as the Hellespont. The strait and the Gallipoli (Gelibolu) peninsula on its western shoreline were the scene of the Battle of Gallipoli during the First World War. The Çanakkale 1915 Bridge, which opened to traffic on 18 March 2022, connects the northwestern province of Çanakkale’s Gelibolu district on the European side and the Lapseki district on the Anatolian side, and is the first bridge to cross over the strait.

Developments of economic activities threaten marine ecosystems including endemic dolphins and harbour porpoises.

== Straits Question ==
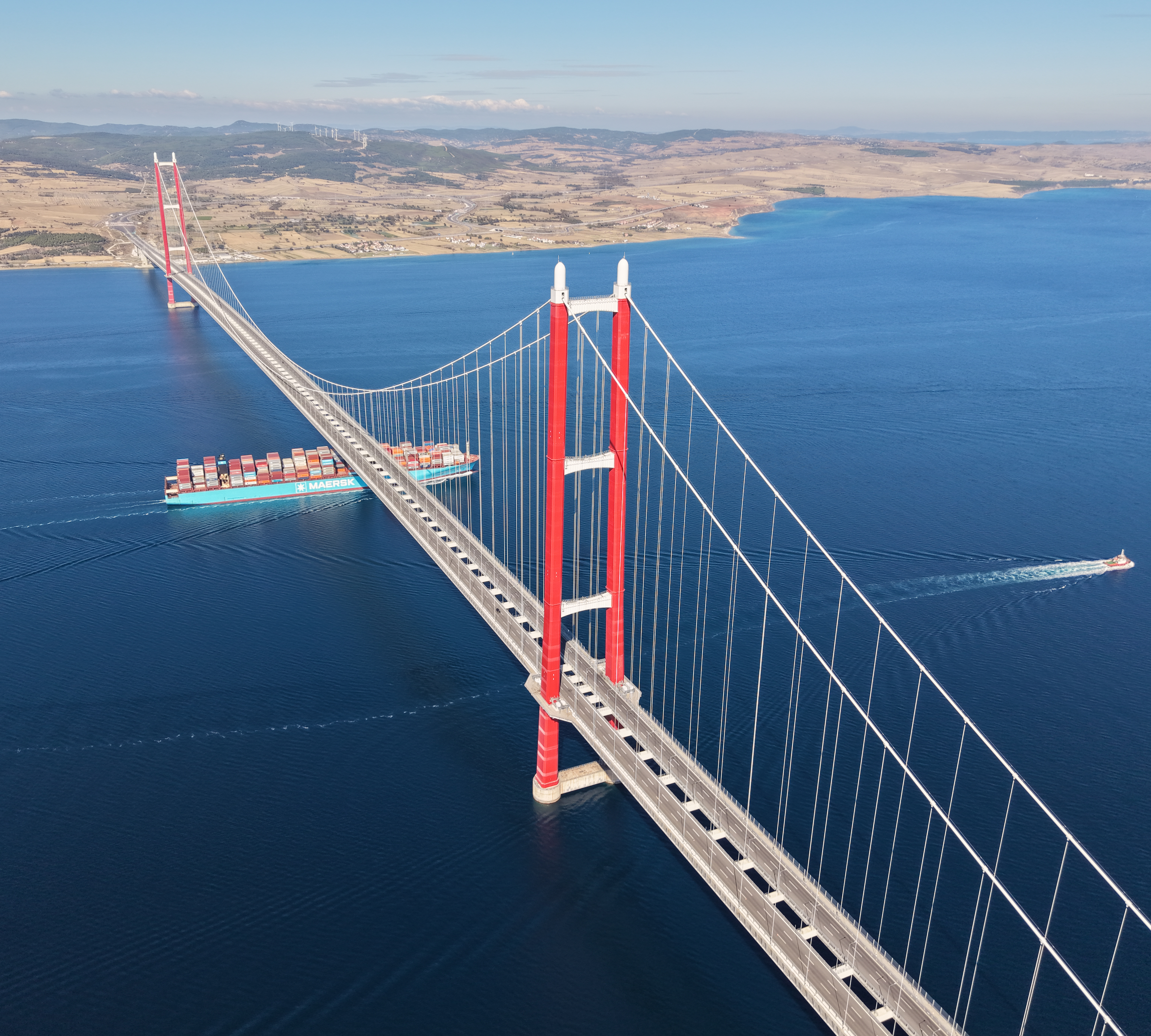
The 1915 Çanakkale Bridge on the Dardanelles strait, connecting Europe and Asia, is the longest suspension bridge in the world.

The Straits have had major maritime strategic importance since at least the Mycenaean period, (Note: Modern historians see the tales of the Trojan War as legendary memories of struggles to dominate or guarantee the Straits and thus the Black Sea trade.) and the narrow crossings between Asia and Europe have provided migration and invasion routes (for Persians, Galatians, and Turks, for example) for even longer. In the declining days of the Ottoman Empire, the "Straits Question" involved the diplomats of Europe and the Ottomans.

The Greek Project developed by Catherine the Great of Russia in the 1780s included plans for Imperial Russia to take control of the Turkish Straits.

The terms of the London Straits Convention concluded on 13 July 1841 between the Great Powers of Europe — Russia, the United Kingdom, France, Austria and Prussia — re-established the "ancient rule" of the Ottoman Empire by closing the Turkish straits to all warships whatsoever, except those of the Ottoman Sultan's allies during wartime. This treaty became one in a series dealing with access to the Bosphorus, the Sea of Marmara, and the Dardanelles. It evolved from the secret 1833 Treaty of Hünkâr İskelesi (Unkiar Skelessi), in which the Ottoman Empire guaranteed exclusive use of the Straits to "Black Sea Powers" (i.e., Ottoman Empire and Russian Empire) warships in the case of a general war.

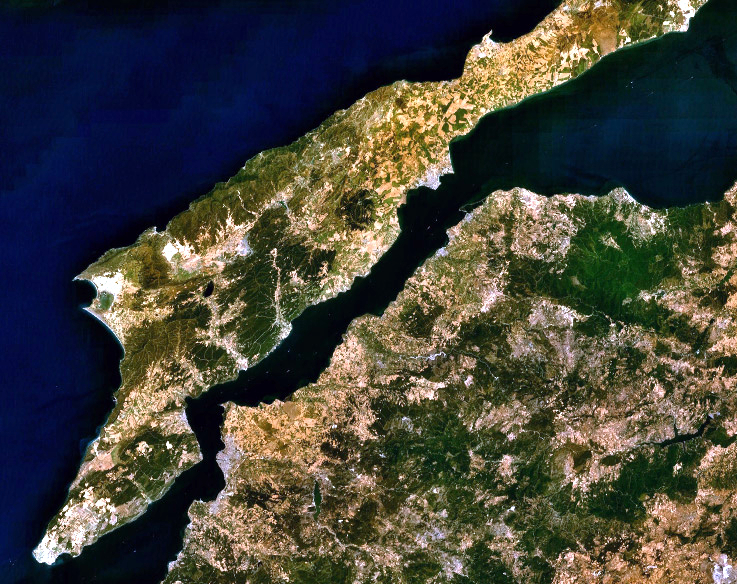
View of the Dardanelles, taken from the Landsat 7 satellite in September 2006. The body of water at the upper left is the Aegean Sea, while the one on the upper right is the Sea of Marmara. The long, narrow upper peninsula is Gallipoli (Turkish: Gelibolu), and constitutes the banks of the continent of Europe, while the lower peninsula is Troad (Turkish: Biga) and constitutes the banks of the continent of Asia. The Dardanelles is the tapered waterway running diagonally between the two peninsulas, from the northeast to the southwest. The city of Çanakkale is visible along the shores of the lower peninsula, centered at the only point where a sharp outcropping juts into the otherwise-linear Dardanelles.

The Straits became especially important in the course of World War I (1914–1918) as a potential link between the Entente powers' Eastern and Western Fronts. Anglo-French naval forces failed to take control of the Dardanelles (February – March 1915), but in the secret Straits Agreement diplomacy of March – April 1915, the members of the Triple Entente agreed — in the event of victory in World War I — to cede Ottoman territory controlling and overlooking the Straits to the Russian Empire. Anglo-French troops then launched the Gallipoli campaign, an ultimately unsuccessful operation to take control of the Straits following amphibious landings on the Gallipoli Peninsula (April 1915 to January 1916). Imperial Russia had had its own scheme to seize the straits in 1914. In late November 1916 Nicholas II's strategists revisited the Russian plans to capture the Bosphorus. They placed the project under the overall command of Vice-admiral Alexander Kolchak, head of the Black Sea Fleet. But the Russian military postponed this "Bosphorus Operation" (Russian: Босфорская операция), scheduled for April 1917, when the Romanian campaign in December 1916 required Russian troops and transport ships. The March 1917 February Revolution in Petrograd led to the abandonment of the proposed attack on the Straits. Russian naval operations in the Black Sea area did include countering the German-Ottoman Black Sea raid of October 1914, the Battle of Cape Sarych (November 1914), the Action of 10 May 1915 north of the Bosporus, the Battle of Kirpen Island (December 1915), and the Action of 8 January 1916.

The modern treaty controlling access is the 1936 Montreux Convention Regarding the Regime of the Straits, which remains in force as of 2025. This Convention mandates that Republic of Turkey allow the free passage of all civilian vessels in peacetime, and requires Turkey to allow warships of some nations to traverse the straits in peacetime, but only under strict conditions — restrictions on number, size, length of stay if entering the Black Sea (if not a Black Sea power), advance notification to Turkey, and other conditions. The convention permits a fee to be charged for pilotage and other services.

== See also ==
- Danish Straits
- Eurasia
- List of maritime incidents in the Turkish Straits
- Marmara region
- Chanak crisis

== Sources ==
- Gerolymatos, André (2014). "The Turkish Straits: History, Politics and Strategic Dilemmas". Ocean Yearbook. 28 (1): 58–79. Bibcode:2014OceYb..28...58G. doi:10.1163/22116001-02801003.
