= Çimenlik Castle =

Ottoman castle

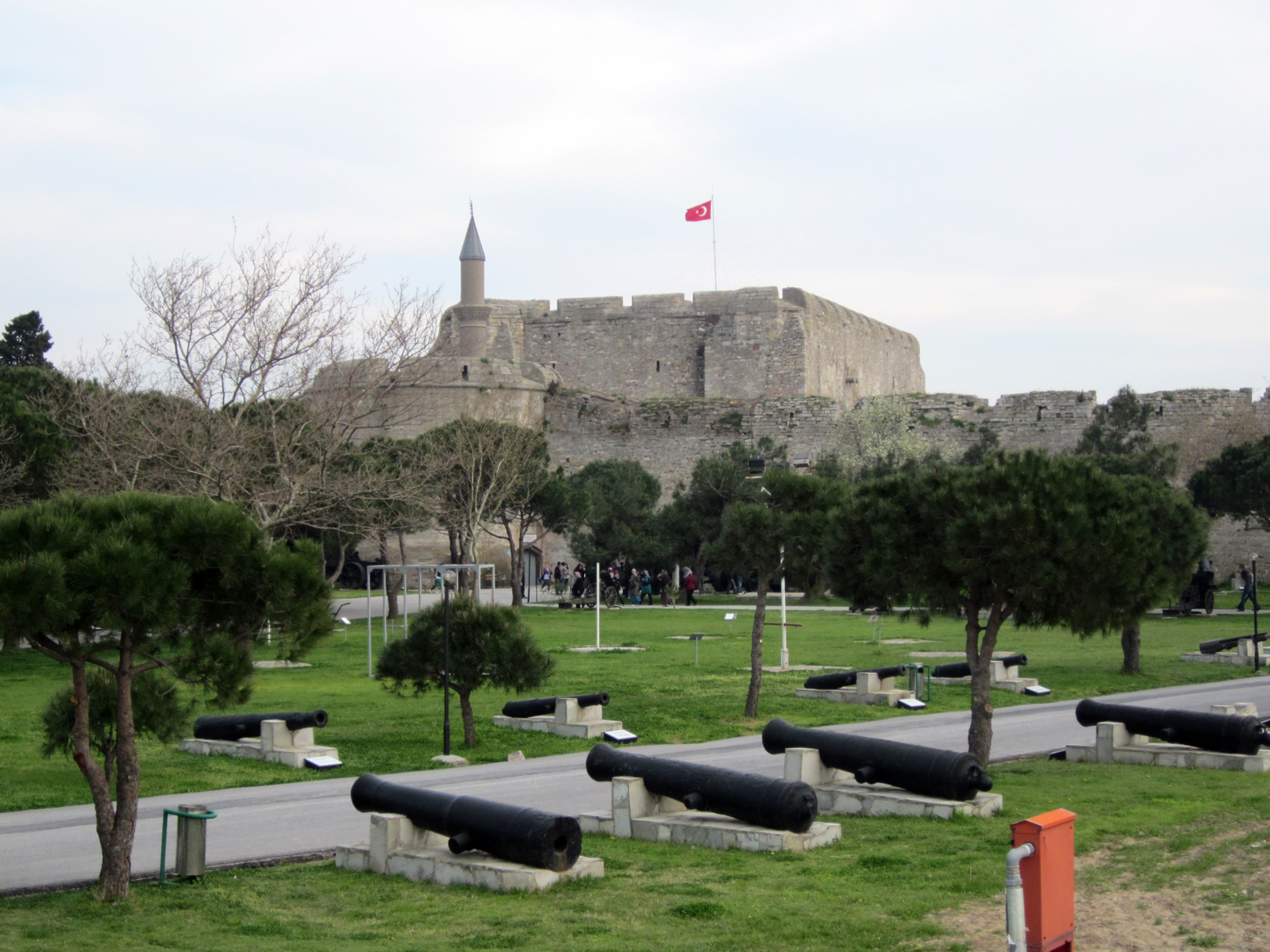
- Çimenlik Castle, which is now a museum
- Interactive map of the Çimenlik Castle area

General information
- Location: Çanakkale, Turkey
- Completed: 1452

Kale-i Sultaniye (formerly Kal'a-i Sultaniye) or Çimenlik Castle is a castle which was built on the Asian shore of the Dardanelles in Turkey in 1462. Today, it is part of the Çanakkale Naval Museum.

== History ==
The castle was erected on the Asian side of the Dardanelles in 1462^{a}, during the reign of Mehmed the Conqueror. Directly opposite the castle, on the European side of the Dardanelles, there is Kilitbahir Castle. The fortress was equipped with 30 cannons, and the 1,250-meter width of the Dardanelles was taken into gun range. The castle was strengthened in 1551 by Suleiman the Magnificent. It was partially renewed during the Cretan War with Venice, and completely renovated during the Napoleonic Wars by Selim III. Kale-i Sultaniye played a key role in the defense of the Dardanelles until World War I.

The seaside walls were rebuilt in the late 19th century as a row of gun emplacements rather than a fortified wall. For this reason, the fort became the target of British and French ships in 1915. The artillery shell that was fired from the British battleship HMS Queen Elizabeth on March 18, 1915, remained unexploded in the 2-meter hole it opened in the northern fortification wall, and is still where it fell.

Today it serves as a museum. In the castle garden and park area, cannons used by different nations in attacks against the Dardanelles throughout history are exhibited.

== Structure of the castle ==
=== Outer walls ===
Çimenlik Castle consists of two parts, the outer walls and the inner castle. The outer walls are 11 meters high, 8 meters wide in places, built on a simple rectangular plan of 100 by 150 meters, and there are 9 bastions on the walls.

=== Castle courtyard ===
In the garden, there is a gunpowder mill and two mosques built during the reigns of Fatih and Abdülaziz and named after them.

=== Inner castle ===
The walls of the inner castle, measuring 42 by 48 meters, are 9.5 meters wide, reaching a height of 25 meters. The first floor of this three-story castle was made from concrete 4 meters above the ground level of the inner courtyard, while the upper two floors were wooden.

== Footnotes ==
1. Some websites and individuals contest the fact that the castle was built in 1462, but more reliable book sources state it as 1452. The "but" in the previous sentence should be read as "and". However: On a website one can find "The fortress has no foundation inscription. The 17th-century Turkish traveller Evliya çelebi, says it was built in AH 856 / AD 1452, before the conquest of Istanbul. Based on various documents the historians Danişmend and Ayverdi have, however, have suggested that it was built in AH 866 / AD 1463 under the supervision of Yakup Pasha."
2. The dimensions of the castle vary on the websites, this article's information is based on more reliable book sources.
