= List of maritime incidents in the Turkish Straits =

The list of maritime incidents in the Turkish Straits is a listing of major maritime casualties that occurred in the Bosphorus and Dardanelles Straits in Turkey. Shipping accidents are a threat to the maritime environment and to human life in the highly populated areas around the straits.

These two straits are among the busiest and most critical seaways in the world, and because of the Bosphorus's status as the narrowest strait used for international navigation, maritime disasters have been common.

== Bosphorus ==
The Bosphorus is a narrow "S-shaped" channel of complex nature with several sharp turns and headlands, which prevent a proper look-out, and with changing currents. Such geographical and oceanographic conditions make the navigation, open to international shipping, very difficult and risky.

The density of maritime traffic in the Bosphorus, which links the Black Sea to the Marmara Sea, has increased elevenfold from around 4,400 ships passing annually in 1936, when the Montreux Convention was signed to regulate transit and navigation in the Straits, to an average of 48,000 vessels per year recently. With 132 vessel transits daily, not including local traffic, it ranks second to the Malacca Straits in density.

During the period from 1953 to 2002, 461 maritime incidents occurred in the Istanbul Strait or in its southern entrance at the Marmara Sea. The majority were collisions.

- December 14, 1960 – Yugoslavian-flagged M/T Petar Zoranić of Croatian operator from Zadar Jugotanker (today Tankerska plovidba), carrying 12,065 tons of highly flammable 90-octane benzine and 11,330 tons of diesel fuel, collided with the Greek tanker M/T World Harmony at Kanlıca Point. 20 officers and crew died, both masters included. 18,000 tons of oil spilled and caused pollution. The fire lasted for some weeks and suspended transit traffic. The Turkish vessel Tarsus crashed into the Zoranić and burned with it.
- September 15, 1964 - Norwegian-flagged vessel Norborn collided with the wreck of Petar Zoranić at Kanlıca Point. Fire broke out and oil spilled.
- March 1, 1966 – Two Soviet-flagged vessels, M/T Lutsk and M/T Kransky Oktiabr, collided at Maiden's Tower Point. 1,850 tons of oil spilled, caught fire and caused the Turkish passenger ferryboat Kadıköy and the ferry boat terminal of Karaköy to burn completely.
- July 3, 1966 – Turkish passenger ferryboat Yeni Galatasaray collided with the lumber-carrying Turkish coaster Aksaray. Thirteen people died in the ensuing fire.
- November 18, 1966 – Turkish passenger ferryboat Bereket hit the Romanian-flagged Ploeşti. Eight people drowned.
- July 1, 1970 – Italian vessel Ancona ran ashore and caused the collapse of a building under construction. Five people died.
- December 27, 1972 – Two Turkish vessels, the passenger ferryboat Turan Emeksiz and the cargo ship M/V Sönmezler, collided. Five people died.
- April 21, 1979 – Romanian-flagged vessel M/V Karpat collided with the Turkish ship M/V Kefeli. Eleven people died.
- November 15, 1979 - Romanian-registered tanker M/T Independenţa collided with Greek freighter M/V Evriali at Haydarpaşa Point and exploded. Forty-two people died on the tanker. 94,600 tons of crude oil spilled and the ensuing fire lasted weeks.
- April 2, 1980 – Greek ship M/V Elsa collided with the Soviet vessel M/V Moskovosky. Two people died.
- November 9, 1980 - British vessel Nordic Faith collided with Greek-flagged ship Stravanda. Fire broke out.
- September 24, 1985 – Turkish Navy fast attack boat TCG Meltem collided with a Soviet Navy warship. Meltem sank and five Turkish marines died.
- October 29, 1988 – Maltese-registered ammonia carrier M/T Blue Star collided with the Turkish crude oil tanker M/T Gaziantep, which was at anchor at Ahırkapı Point. 1,000 tons of ammonia spilled into the Marmara Sea.
- March 25, 1990 – Iraqi tanker M/T Jampur, carrying gasoline, collided with the Chinese-flagged bulk carrier M/V Da Tung Shang at Sarıyer Point. 2,600 tons of oil spilled from Jampur and caused severe pollution.
- November 14, 1991 - Philippines-flagged M/V Madonna Lily collided with the Lebanese-flagged livestock carrier M/V Rabunion XVIII at Anadoluhisarı Point. Five people died, while 21,000 sheep drowned in the sunk Lebanese vessel and their corpses caused major pollution.
- March 13, 1994 – Crude oil carrier M/T Nassia collided with the bulk carrier M/V Shipbroker, both Cyprus-registered. Twenty-seven people were killed. 9,000 tons of petroleum spilled and 20,000 tons burnt over four days, severely affecting the marine environment. Traffic in the strait was suspended for several days and Shipbroker burnt totally.
- December 29, 1999 - Russian tanker M/T Volganeft-248 grounded at Florya Point with 4,000 tons of fuel oil on board and split into two pieces. 1,500 tons of oil spilled to the sea. Clean-up operation of the contaminated recreational beaches took about two years.
- October 7, 2002 - Maltese vessel M/V Gotia stranded at Bebek Point. Twenty-two tons of oil spilled, causing environmental damage to the boats in the marina and the structures at the waterfront.
- November 10, 2003 - Georgian-flagged cargo ship GGC Svyatoy Panteleymon ran aground off Anadolufeneri and broke in two. Around 500 tons of oil spilled and caused pollution.
- May 4, 2013 - The ferries Erdem Karadeniz and Kalamis collided in heavy early-morning fog, injuring four passengers.
- September 6, 2013, the Turkish general-cargo ship Erhan Araz (IMO 8512059) ran aground near Beykoz.
- September 14, 2013 - Togolese general cargo ship Captain Omar (IMO 7396654) experienced engine failure during transit of the straits. She was towed to Beykoz.
- October 1, 2013 - Turkish general cargo ship Anafarta (IMO 6720066) took on water at the Black Sea entrance to the strait. She was intentionally grounded to prevent her from sinking. The crew were rescued.
- October 22, 2013 - Cambodian general cargo ship Volgo-Balt 193 (IMO 8230302) suffered a mechanical problem in transit near Maiden's Tower that required her to be towed to a safe harbor.
- October 28, 2013 - Maltese chemical tanker YM Miranda (IMO 9554755) suffered an engine fire in the straits. In distress, the master deployed one or more anchors. These destroyed one fiber-optic undersea cable and damaged another near Anadolu Hisari. The straits were closed as tugboats rendered assistance.
- November 13, 2013 - Liquid propane gas tanker Tala (IMO 8012114) suffered an engine failure requiring the assistance of a tug.

== Dardanelles ==
- April 4, 1953 - Turkish Navy submarine TCG Dumlupınar collided with the Swedish-flagged freighter M/V Naboland. Dumlupınar sank with the loss of 81 of the 86 submariners aboard.

== Shipwrecks ==
The number of shipwrecks as of 2000 within the Turkish Straits is as follows (totaling 35):

- 23 in the Istanbul Strait
- 3 in the Marmara Sea
- 9 in the Çanakkale Strait
