= History of the Ottoman Empire =

The Ottoman Empire was founded c. 1299 by Turkoman chieftain Osman I as a small beylik in northwestern Anatolia just south of the Byzantine capital Constantinople. In 1326, the Ottoman Turks captured nearby Bursa, cutting off Asia Minor from Byzantine control and making Bursa their capital. The Ottoman Turks first crossed into Europe in 1352, establishing a permanent settlement at Çimpe Castle on the Dardanelles in 1354 and moving their capital to Edirne (Adrianople) in 1369. At the same time, the numerous small Turkic states in Asia Minor were assimilated into the budding Ottoman Sultanate through conquest or declarations of allegiance.

As Sultan Mehmed II conquered Constantinople (today named Istanbul) in 1453, transforming it into the new Ottoman capital, the state grew into a substantial empire, expanding deep into Europe, northern Africa and the Middle East. With most of the Balkans under Ottoman rule by the mid-16th century, Ottoman territory increased significantly under Sultan Selim I, who assumed the Caliphate in 1517 as the Ottomans turned east and conquered western Arabia, Egypt, Mesopotamia and the Levant, among other territories. Within the next few decades, much of the North African coast (except Morocco) became part of the Ottoman realm.

The empire reached its apex under Suleiman the Magnificent in the 16th century, when it stretched from the Persian Gulf in the east to Algeria in the west, and from Yemen in the south to Hungary and parts of Ukraine in the north. According to the Ottoman decline thesis, Suleiman's reign was the zenith of the Ottoman classical period, during which Ottoman culture, arts, and political influence flourished. The empire reached its maximum territorial extent in 1683, on the eve of the Battle of Vienna.

From 1699 onwards, the Ottoman Empire began to lose territory over the course of the next two centuries due to internal stagnation, costly defensive wars, European colonialism, and nationalist revolts among its multiethnic subjects. In any case, the need to modernise was evident to the empire's leaders by the early 19th century, and numerous administrative reforms were implemented in an attempt to forestall the decline of the empire, with varying degrees of success. The gradual weakening of the Ottoman Empire gave rise to the Eastern Question in the mid-19th century.

The empire came to an end in the aftermath of its defeat in World War I, when its remaining territory was partitioned by the Allies. The sultanate was officially abolished by the Government of the Turkish Grand National Assembly in Ankara on 1 November 1922 following the Turkish War of Independence. Throughout its more than 600 years of existence, the Ottoman Empire has left a profound legacy in the Middle East and Southeast Europe, as can be seen in the customs, culture, and cuisine of the various countries that were once part of its realm.

== Ottoman etiology ==
With the end of the First World War and the Dissolution of the Ottoman Empire, questions arose in a geopolitical and historical context about the reasons for the emergence and decline of the Ottomans, the reasons for the emergence and decline of their empire and how both events were defined. On the eve of World War II, the geographical position and the geopolitical weight of Turkey, the major historical heir to the Ottoman Empire, gave weight to the issues as propaganda. The first item on the agenda of the Tehran conference was the issue of Turkey's participation in World War II by the end of 1943.

== Historiography ==
Ottoman Empire

== Rise of the Ottoman Empire (1299–1453) ==
With the demise of the Seljuk Sultanate of Rum during 12th to 13th century, Anatolia was divided into a patchwork of independent states, the so-called Anatolian Beyliks. For the next few decades, these Beyliks were under the sovereignty of Mongolians and their Iranian Kingdom Ilkhanids. By 1300, a weakened Byzantine Empire had lost most of its Anatolian provinces to these Turkish principalities. One of the beyliks was led by Osman I (d. 1323/4), from which the name Ottoman is derived, son of Ertuğrul, around Eskişehir in western Anatolia. In the foundation myth expressed in the story known as "Osman's Dream", the young Osman was inspired to conquest by a prescient vision of empire (according to his dream, the empire is a big tree whose roots spread through three continents and whose branches cover the sky). According to his dream the tree, which was Osman's Empire, issued four rivers from its roots, the Tigris, the Euphrates, the Nile and the Danube. Additionally, the tree shaded four mountain ranges, the Caucasus, the Taurus, the Atlas and the Balkan ranges. During his reign as Sultan, Osman I extended the frontiers of Turkish settlement toward the edge of the Byzantine Empire.

A map of independent Turkic beyliks in Anatolia during the 14th century

During this period, a formal Ottoman government was created whose institutions would change drastically over the life of the empire.

In the century after the death of Osman I, Ottoman rule began to extend over the Eastern Mediterranean and the Balkans. Osman's son, Orhan, captured the city of Bursa in 1326 and made it the new capital of the Ottoman state. The fall of Bursa meant the loss of Byzantine control over Northwestern Anatolia.

After securing their flank in Asia Minor, the Ottomans then crossed into Europe from 1352 onwards; within a decade, almost all of Thrace had been conquered by the Ottomans, cutting off Constantinople from its Balkan hinterlands. The Ottoman capital was moved to Adrianople Edirne in 1369. The important city of Thessaloniki was captured from the Venetians in 1387. The Ottoman victory at Kosovo in 1389 effectively marked the end of Serbian power in the region, paving the way for Ottoman expansion into Europe. The Battle of Nicopolis in 1396, widely regarded as the last large-scale crusade of the Middle Ages, failed to stop the advance of the victorious Ottoman Turks. With the extension of Turkish dominion into the Balkans, the strategic conquest of Constantinople became a crucial objective. The Empire controlled nearly all former Byzantine lands surrounding the city, but the Byzantines were temporarily relieved when Timur invaded Anatolia in the Battle of Ankara in 1402. He took Sultan Bayezid I as a prisoner. The capture of Bayezid I threw the Turks into disorder. The state fell into a civil war that lasted from 1402 to 1413, as Bayezid's sons fought over succession. It ended when Mehmed I emerged as the sultan and restored Ottoman power, bringing an end to the Interregnum.

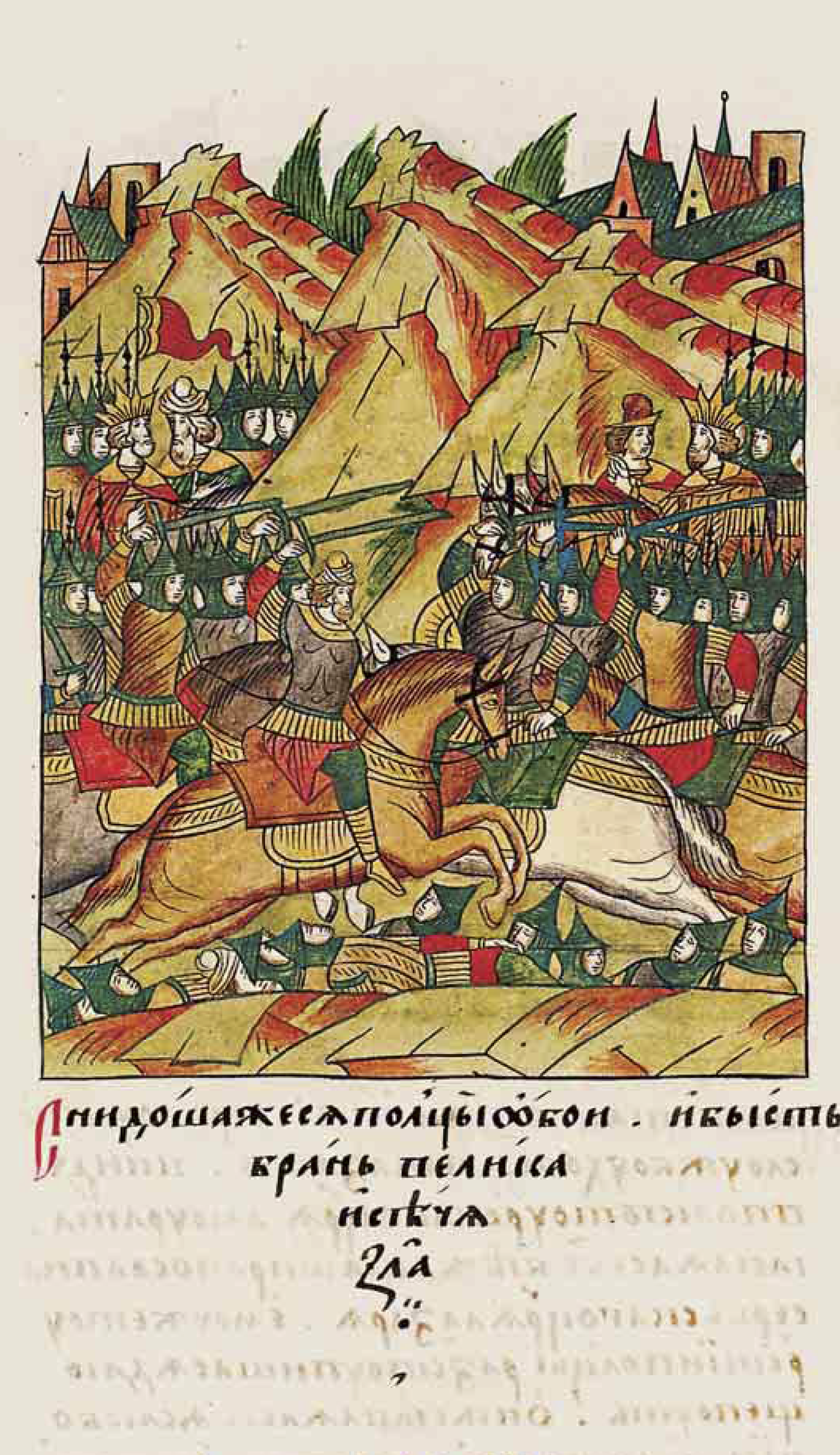
Battle of Kosovo (1389)

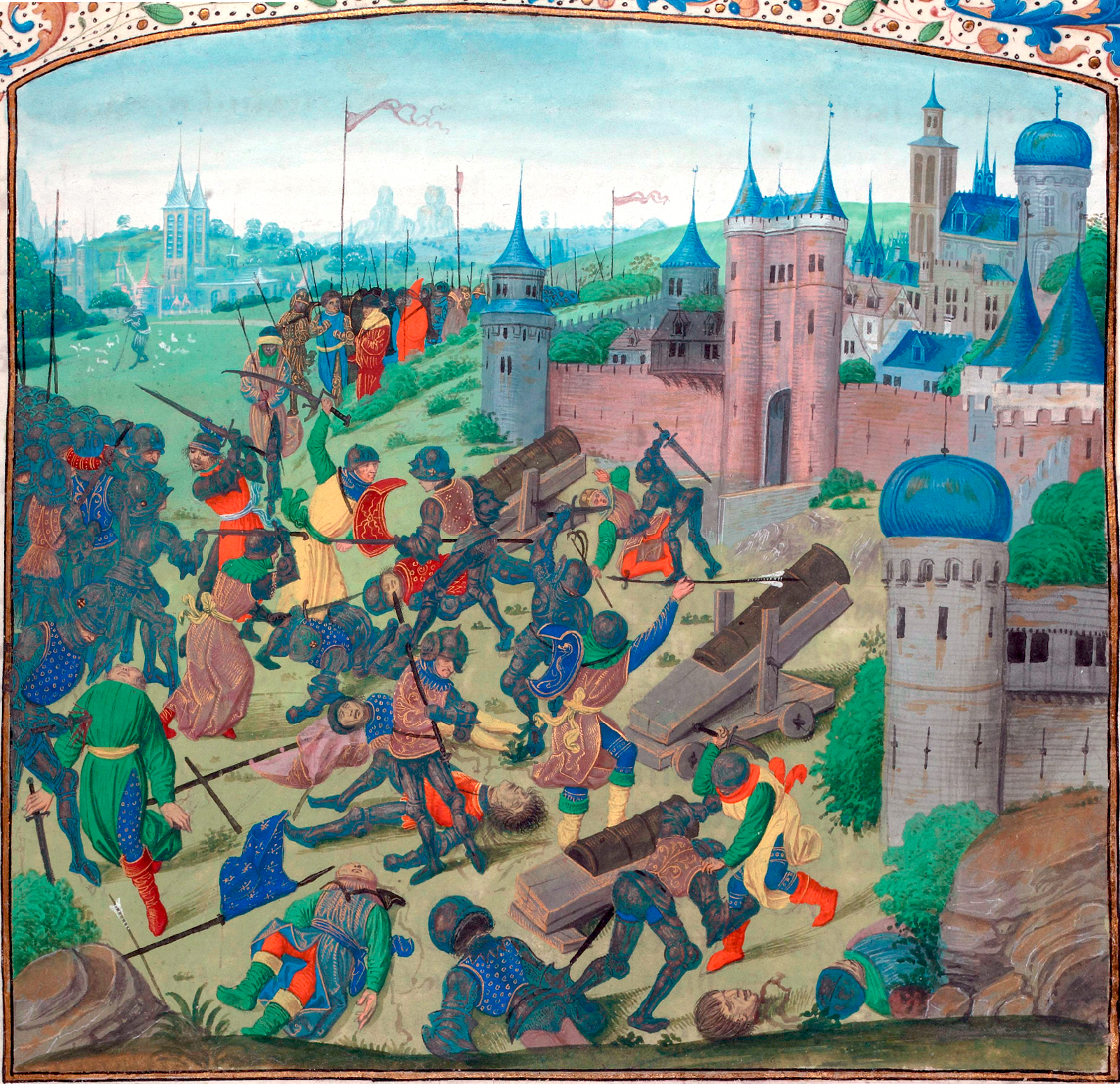
Battle of Nicopolis (1396)

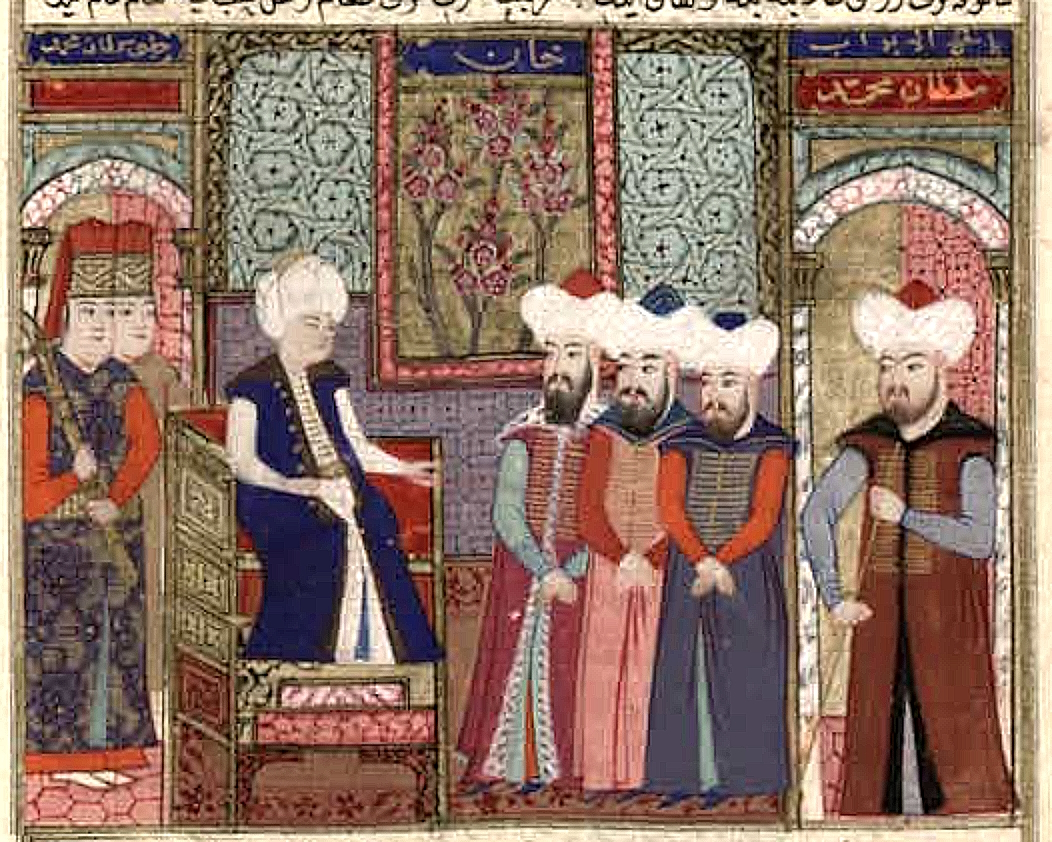
Sultan Mehmed I. Ottoman miniature, 1413-1421

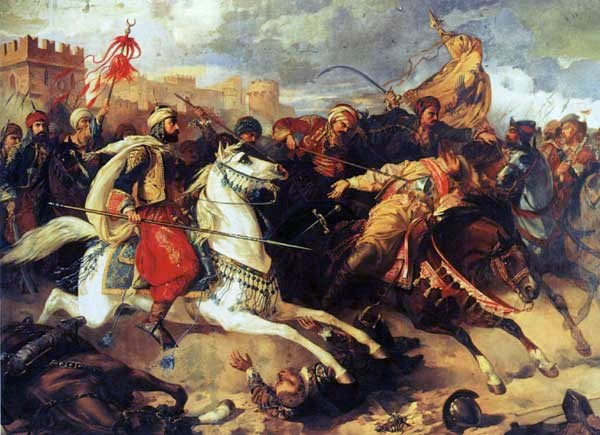
Battle of Varna (1444)

Part of the Ottoman territories in the Balkans (such as Thessaloniki, Macedonia and Kosovo) were temporarily lost after 1402, but were later recovered by Murad II between the 1430s and 1450s. On 10 November 1444, Murad II defeated the Hungarian, Polish and Wallachian armies under Władysław III of Poland (also King of Hungary) and János Hunyadi at the Battle of Varna, which was the final battle of the Crusade of Varna. Four years later, János Hunyadi prepared another army (of Hungarian and Wallachian forces) to attack the Turks, but was again defeated by Murad II at the Second Battle of Kosovo in 1448.

The son of Murad II, Mehmed the Conqueror, reorganized the state and the military, and demonstrated his martial prowess by capturing Constantinople on 29 May 1453, at the age of 21.

== Classical Age (1453–1566) ==
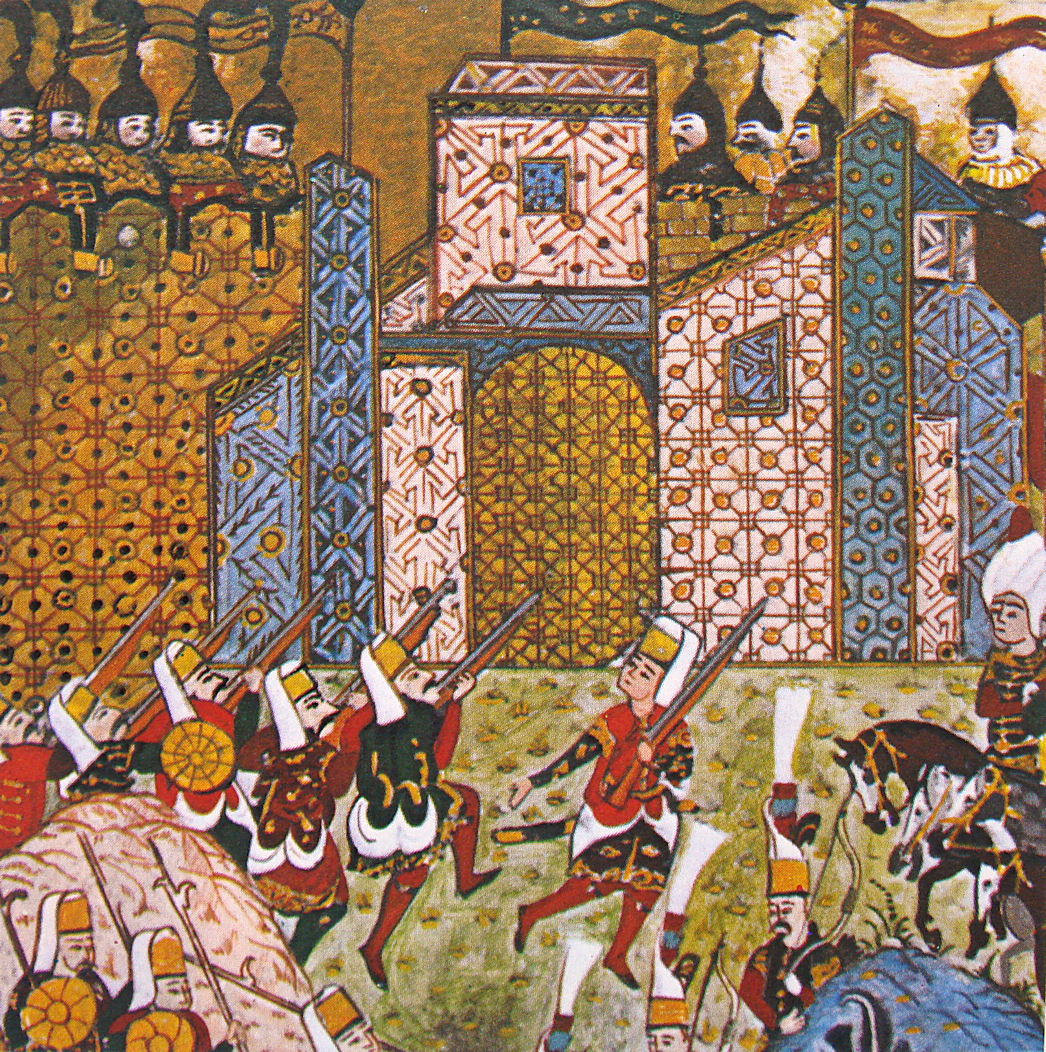
Siege of Rhodes (1522)

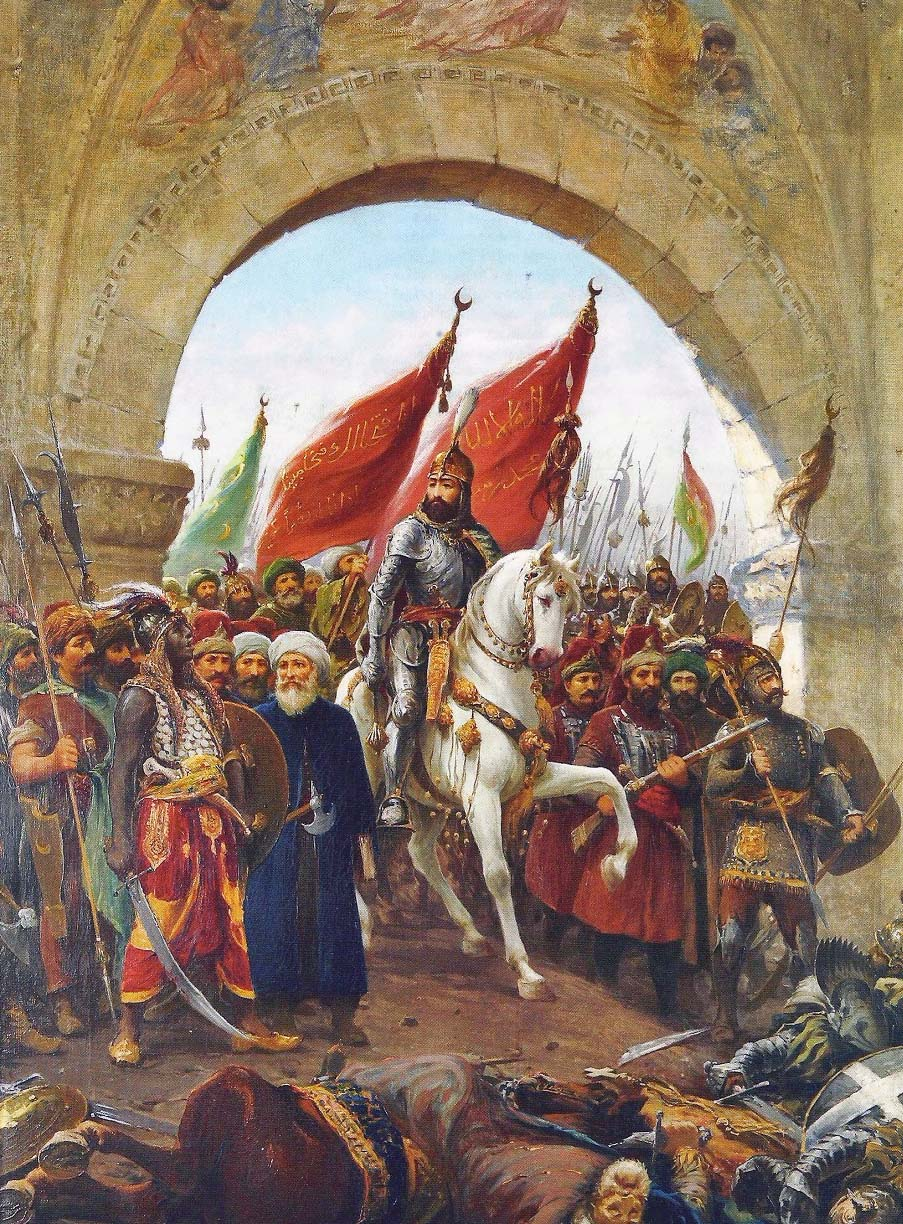
Fall of Constantinople (1453)

The Ottoman conquest of Constantinople in 1453 by Mehmed II cemented the status of the Empire as the preeminent power in southeastern Europe and the eastern Mediterranean. After taking Constantinople, Mehmed met with the Orthodox patriarch, Gennadios and worked out an arrangement in which the Eastern Orthodox Church, in exchange for being able to maintain its autonomy and land, accepted Ottoman authority. Because of bad relations between the latter Byzantine Empire and the states of western Europe as epitomized by Loukas Notaras's famous remark "Better the Sultan's turban than the Cardinal's Hat", the majority of the Orthodox population accepted Ottoman rule as preferable to Venetian rule.

Upon making Constantinople (present-day Istanbul) the new capital of the Ottoman Empire in 1453, Mehmed II assumed the title of Kayser-i Rûm (literally Caesar Romanus, i.e. Roman Emperor.) In order to consolidate this claim, he would launch a campaign to conquer Rome, the western capital of the former Roman Empire. To this aim he spent many years securing positions on the Adriatic Sea, such as in Albania Veneta, and then continued with the Ottoman invasion of Otranto and Apulia on 28 July 1480. The Turks stayed in Otranto and its surrounding areas for nearly a year, but after Mehmed II's death on 3 May 1481, plans for penetrating deeper into the Italian peninsula with fresh new reinforcements were given up on and cancelled and the remaining Ottoman troops sailed back to the east of the Adriatic Sea.

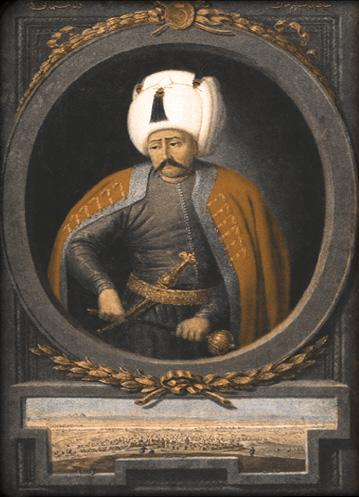
Selim I conquered the Mamluk Sultanate of Egypt, making the Turks the dominant power in the Islamic world.

During this period in the 15th and 16th centuries, the Ottoman Empire entered a long period of conquest and expansion, extending its borders deep into Europe and North Africa. Conquests on land were driven by the discipline and innovation of the Ottoman military; and on the sea, the Ottoman Navy aided this expansion significantly. The navy also contested and protected key seagoing trade routes, in competition with the Italian city states in the Black, Aegean and Mediterranean seas and the Portuguese in the Red Sea and Indian Ocean.

The state also flourished economically due to its control of the major overland trade routes between Europe and Asia.

The Empire prospered under the rule of a line of committed and effective Sultans. Sultan Selim I (1512–1520) dramatically expanded the Empire's eastern and southern frontiers by defeating Shah Ismail I of Safavid Persia, in 1514 at the Battle of Chaldiran. Selim I established Ottoman rule in Egypt, and created a naval presence on the Red Sea. After this Ottoman expansion, a competition started between the Portuguese Empire and the Ottoman Empire to become the dominant power in the region. This conquest ended with the execution of Tuman Bay II.

Selim's successor, Suleiman the Magnificent (1520–1566), further expanded upon Selim's conquests. After capturing Belgrade in 1521, Suleiman conquered the southern and central parts of the Kingdom of Hungary (the western, northern and northeastern parts remained independent).

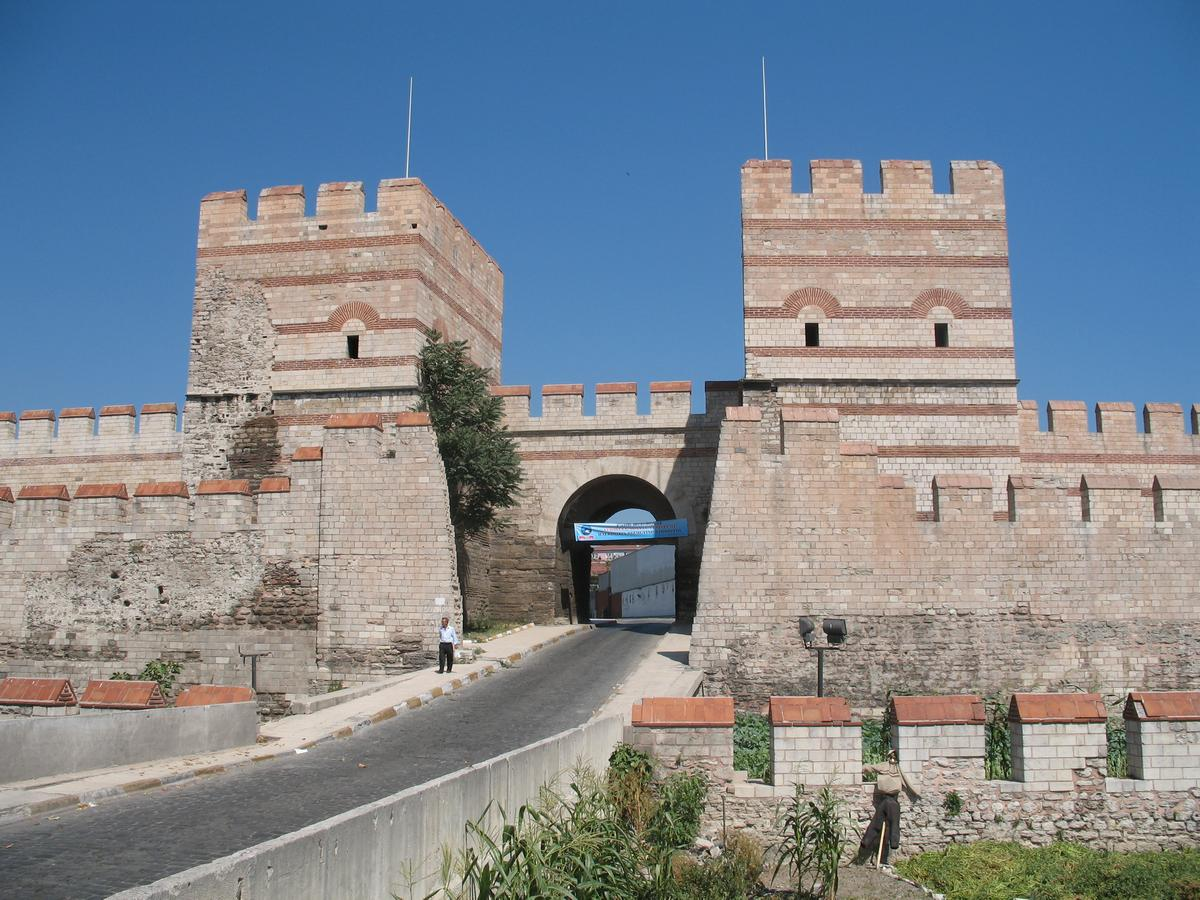
Walls of Constantinople (Gate of Belgrade)

After his victory in the Battle of Mohács in 1526, he established Turkish rule in the territory of present-day Hungary (except the western region) and other Central European territories, (See also: Ottoman–Hungarian Wars). He then laid siege to Vienna in 1529, but failed to take the city after the onset of winter forced his retreat.

In 1532, he made another attack on Vienna, but was repulsed in the Siege of Güns, 97 kilometres (60 mi) south of the city at the fortress of Güns. In the other version of the story, the city's commander, Nikola Jurišić, was offered terms for a nominal surrender. However, Suleiman withdrew at the arrival of the August rains and did not continue towards Vienna as previously planned, but turned homeward instead.

After further advances by the Turks in 1543, the Habsburg ruler Ferdinand officially recognized Ottoman ascendancy in Hungary in 1547. During the reign of Suleiman, Transylvania, Wallachia and, intermittently, Moldavia, became tributary principalities of the Ottoman Empire. In the east, the Ottoman Turks took Baghdad from the Persians in 1535, gaining control of Mesopotamia and naval access to the Persian Gulf. By the end of Suleiman's reign, the Empire's population totaled about 15,000,000 people.

Under Selim and Suleiman the Magnificent, the Empire became a dominant naval force, controlling much of the Mediterranean. The exploits of the Ottoman admiral Barbarossa Hayreddin Pasha, who commanded the Ottoman Navy during Suleiman's reign, led to a number of military victories over Christian navies. Important naval victories of the Ottoman Empire in this period include the Battle of Preveza (1538); Battle of Ponza (1552); Battle of Djerba (1560); conquest of Algiers (in 1516 and 1529) and Tunis (in 1534 and 1574) from Spain; conquest of Rhodes (1522) and Tripoli (1551) from the Knights of St. John; capture of Nice (1543) from the Holy Roman Empire; capture of Corsica (1553) from the Republic of Genoa; capture of the Balearic Islands (1558) from Spain; capture of Aden (1548), Muscat (1552) and Aceh (1565–67) from Portugal during the Indian Ocean expeditions; among others.

The conquests of Nice (1543) and Corsica (1553) occurred on behalf of France as a joint venture between the forces of the French king Francis I and the Ottoman sultan Suleiman I, and were commanded by the Ottoman admirals Barbarossa Hayreddin Pasha and Turgut Reis. A month prior to the siege of Nice, France supported the Ottomans with an artillery unit during the Ottoman conquest of Esztergom in 1543. France and the Ottoman Empire, united by mutual opposition to Habsburg rule in both Southern and Central Europe, became strong allies during this period. The alliance was economic and military, as the sultans granted France the right of trade within the Empire without levy of taxation. By this time, the Ottoman Empire was a significant and accepted part of the European political sphere. It made a military alliance with France, the Kingdom of England and the Dutch Republic against Habsburg Spain, Italy and Habsburg Austria.

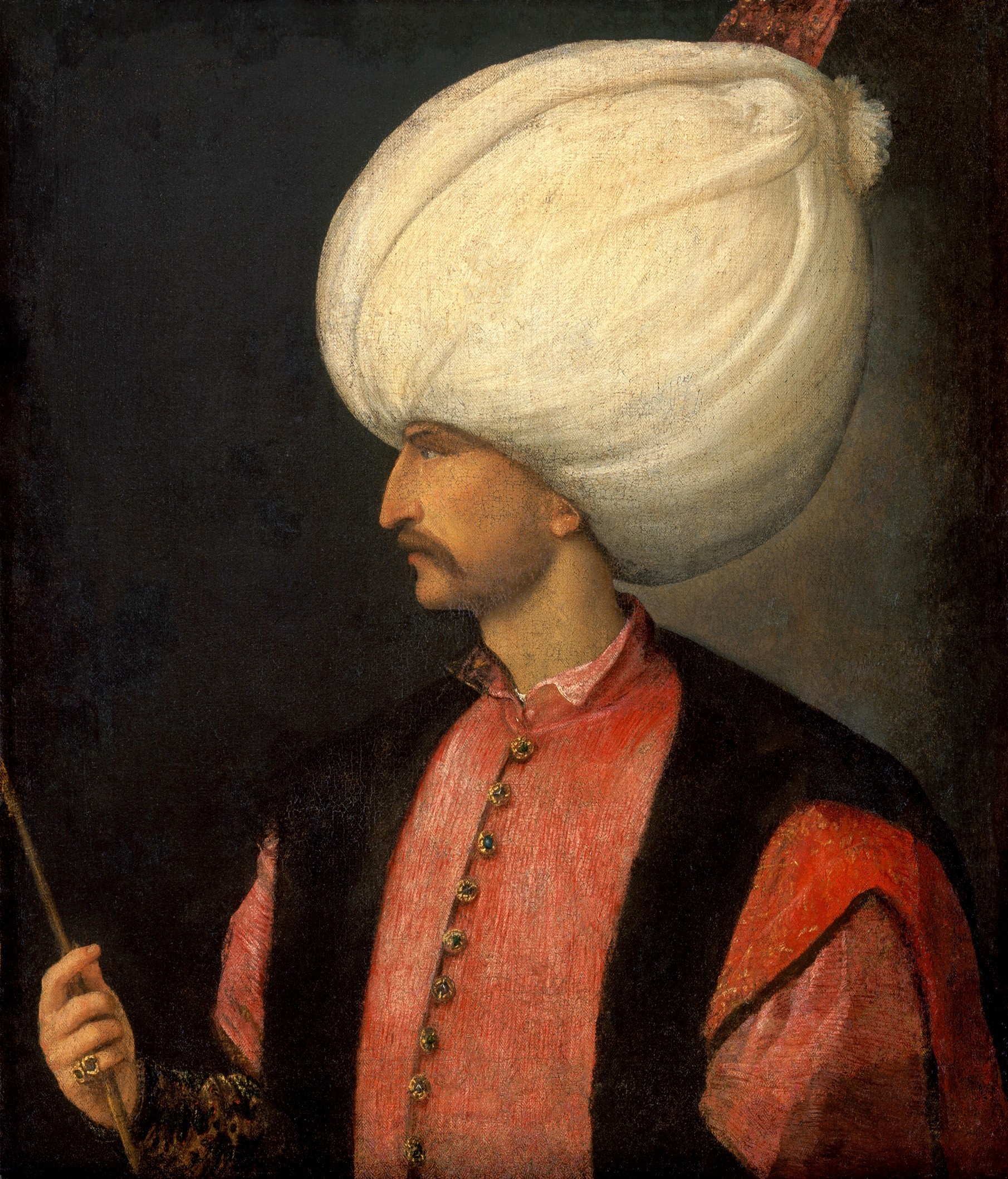
Suleiman the Magnificent became a prominent monarch of 16th-century Europe, presiding over the apex of the Ottoman Empire's power.

Suleiman I's policy of expansion throughout the Mediterranean basin was however halted in Malta in 1565. During a summer-long siege which was later to be known as the Siege of Malta, the Ottoman forces which numbered around 50,000 fought the Knights of St. John and the Maltese garrison of 6000 men. Stubborn resistance by the Maltese led to the lifting of the siege in September. The unsuccessful siege (the Turks managed to capture the Isle of Gozo together with Fort Saint Elmo on the main island of Malta, but failed elsewhere and retreated) was the second and last defeat experienced by Suleiman the Magnificent after the likewise inconclusive first Ottoman siege of Vienna in 1529. Suleiman I died of natural causes in his tent during the Siege of Szigetvár in 1566. The Battle of Lepanto in 1571 (which was triggered by the Ottoman capture of Venetian-controlled Cyprus in 1570) was another major setback for Ottoman naval supremacy in the Mediterranean Sea, despite the fact that an equally large Ottoman fleet was built in a short time and Tunisia was recovered from Spain in 1574.

As the 16th century progressed, Ottoman naval superiority was challenged by the growing sea powers of western Europe, particularly Portugal, in the Persian Gulf, Indian Ocean and the Spice Islands. With the Ottoman Turks blockading sea-lanes to the East and South, the European powers were driven to find another way to the ancient silk and spice routes, now under Ottoman control. On land, the Empire was preoccupied by military campaigns in Austria and Persia, two widely separated theatres of war. The strain of these conflicts on the Empire's resources, and the logistics of maintaining lines of supply and communication across such vast distances, ultimately rendered its sea efforts unsustainable and unsuccessful. The overriding military need for defence on the western and eastern frontiers of the Empire eventually made effective long-term engagement on a global scale impossible.

== Transformation of the Ottoman Empire (1566–1700) ==
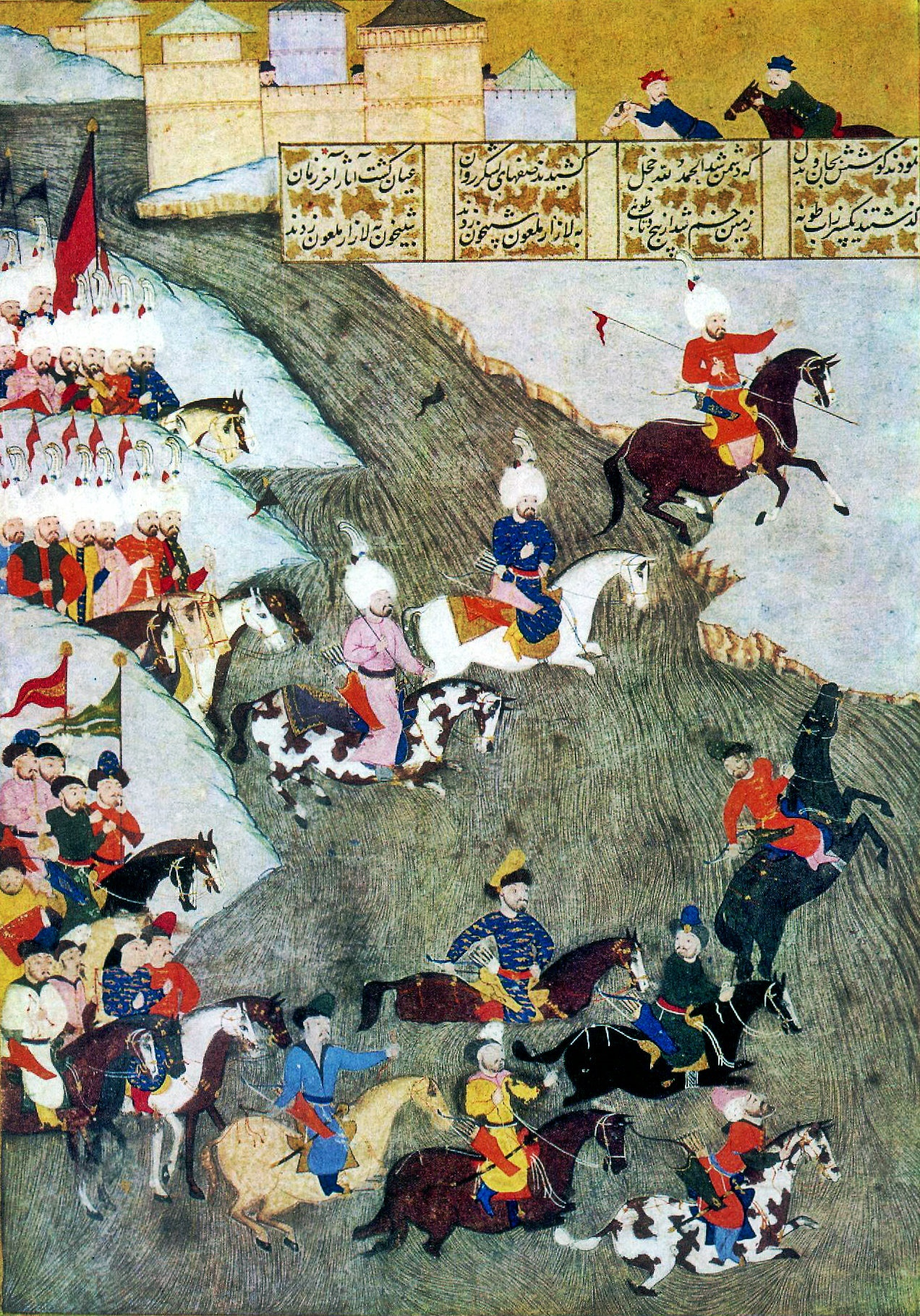
Ottoman miniature about the Szigetvár campaign showing Ottoman troops and Tatars as avantgarde.

European states initiated efforts at this time to curb Ottoman control of the traditional overland trade routes between East Asia and Western Europe, which started with the Silk Road. Western European states began to avoid the Ottoman trade monopoly by establishing their own maritime routes to Asia through new discoveries at sea. The Portuguese discovery of the Cape of Good Hope in 1488 initiated a series of Ottoman–Portuguese naval wars in the Indian Ocean throughout the 16th century. Economically, the Price Revolution caused rampant inflation in both Europe and the Middle East. This had serious negative consequences at all levels of Ottoman society.

The expansion of Muscovite Russia under Ivan IV (1533–1584) into the Volga and Caspian region at the expense of the Tatar khanates disrupted the northern pilgrimage and trade routes. A highly ambitious plan to counter this conceived by Sokollu Mehmed Pasha, Grand Vizier under Selim II, in the shape of a Don-Volga canal (begun June 1569), combined with an attack on Astrakhan, failed, the canal being abandoned with the onset of winter. Henceforth the Empire returned to its existing strategy of utilizing the Crimean Khanate as its bulwark against Russia. In 1571, the Crimean khan Devlet I Giray, supported by the Ottomans, burned Moscow. The next year, the invasion was repeated but repelled at the Battle of Molodi. The Crimean Khanate continued to invade Eastern Europe in a series of slave raids, and remained a significant power in Eastern Europe and a threat to Muscovite Russia in particular until the end of the 17th century.

Battle of Lepanto in 1571.

In southern Europe, a coalition of Catholic powers, led by Philip II of Spain, formed an alliance to challenge Ottoman naval strength in the Mediterranean. Their victory over the Ottoman fleet at the Battle of Lepanto (1571) was a startling blow to the image of Ottoman invincibility. However, historians today stress the symbolic and not the strictly military significance of the battle, for within six months of the defeat a new Ottoman fleet of some 250 sail including eight modern galleasses had been built, with the shipyards of Istanbul turning out a new ship every day at the height of the construction. In discussions with a Venetian minister, the Ottoman Grand Vizier commented: "In capturing Cyprus from you, we have cut off one of your arms; in defeating our fleet you have merely shaved off our beard". The Ottoman naval recovery persuaded Venice to sign a peace treaty in 1573, and the Ottomans were able to expand and consolidate their position in North Africa. However, what could not be replaced were the experienced naval officers and sailors. The Battle of Lepanto was far more damaging to the Ottoman navy in sapping experienced manpower than the loss of ships, which were rapidly replaced.

By contrast, the Habsburg frontier had settled into a reasonably permanent border, marked only by relatively minor battles concentrating on the possession of individual fortresses. The stalemate was caused by a stiffening of the Habsburg defences and reflected simple geographical limits: in the pre-mechanized age, Vienna marked the furthest point that an Ottoman army could march from Istanbul during the early spring to late autumn campaigning season. It also reflected the difficulties imposed on the Empire by the need to support two separate fronts: one against the Austrians (see: Ottoman wars in Europe), and the other against a rival Islamic state, the Safavids of Persia (see: Ottoman wars in Near East).

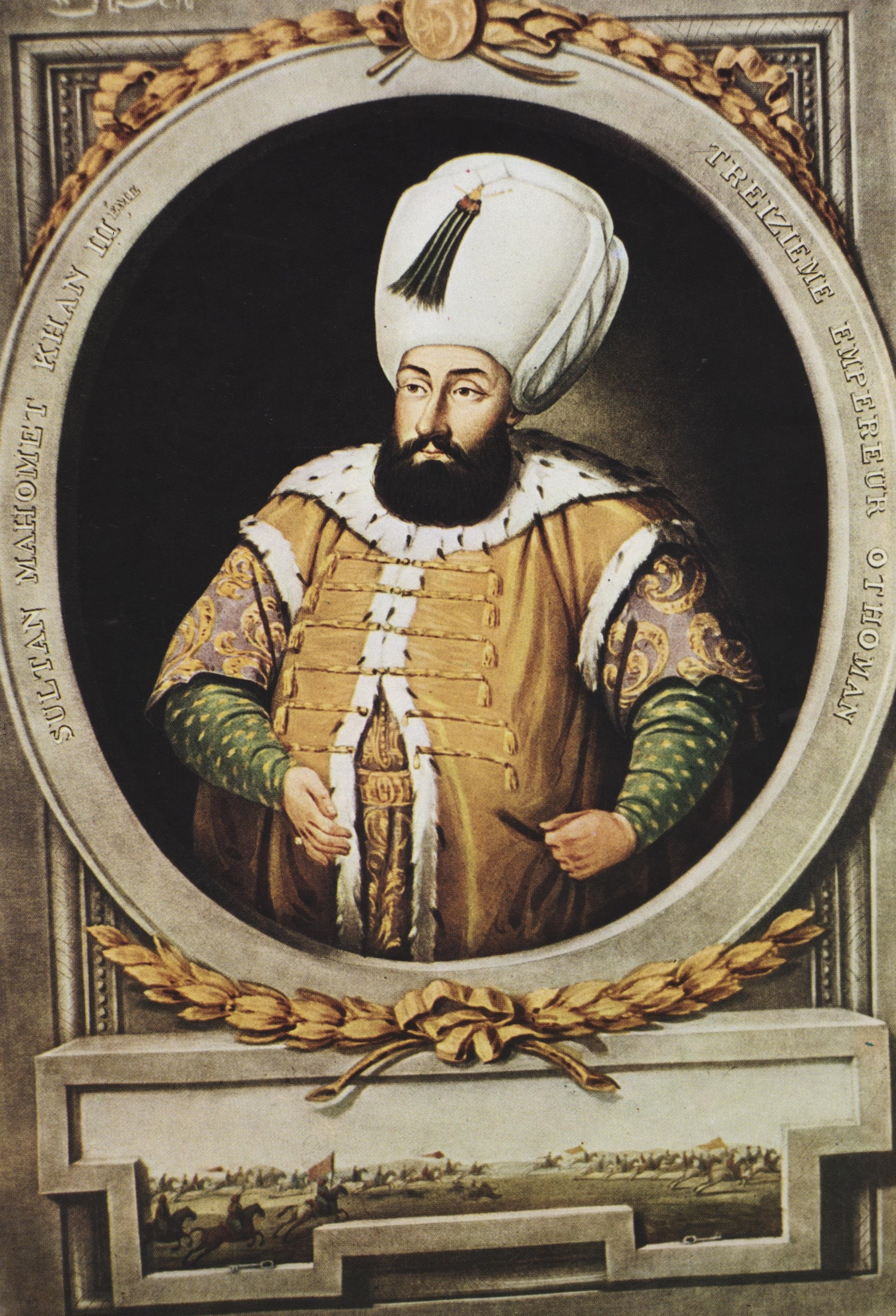
Mehmed III's armies defeated the Habsburg and Transylvanian forces at the Battle of Keresztes.

Changes in European military tactics and weaponry in the military revolution caused the Sipahi cavalry to lose military relevance. The Long War against Austria (1593–1606) created the need for greater numbers of infantry equipped with firearms. This resulted in a relaxation of recruitment policy and a significant growth in Janissary corps numbers. Irregular sharpshooters (Sekban) were also recruited for the same reasons and on demobilization turned to brigandage in the Jelali revolts (1595–1610), which engendered widespread anarchy in Anatolia in the late 16th and early 17th centuries. With the Empire's population reaching 30,000,000 people by 1600, shortage of land placed further pressure on the government.

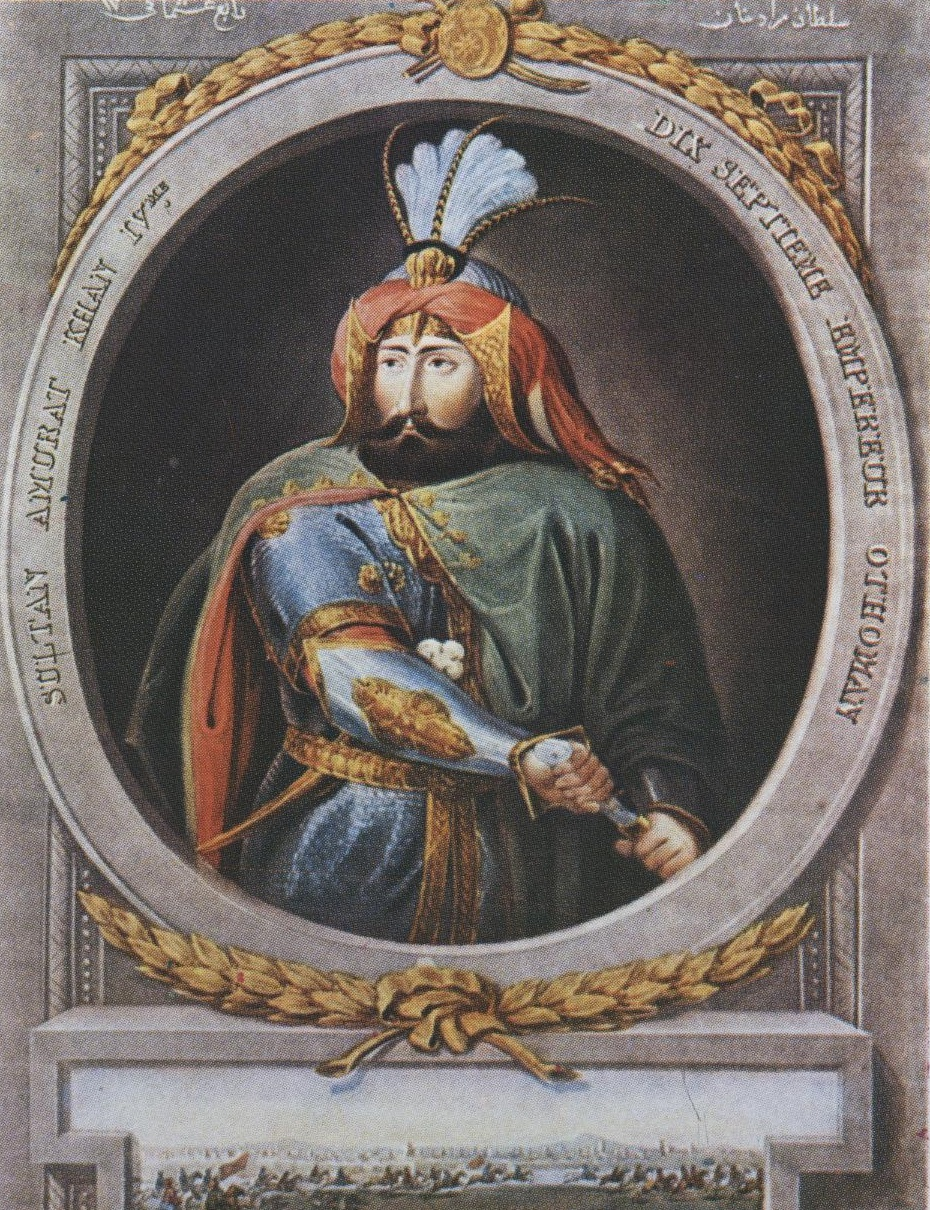
Murad IV reconquered Baghdad from the Safavids in 1638.

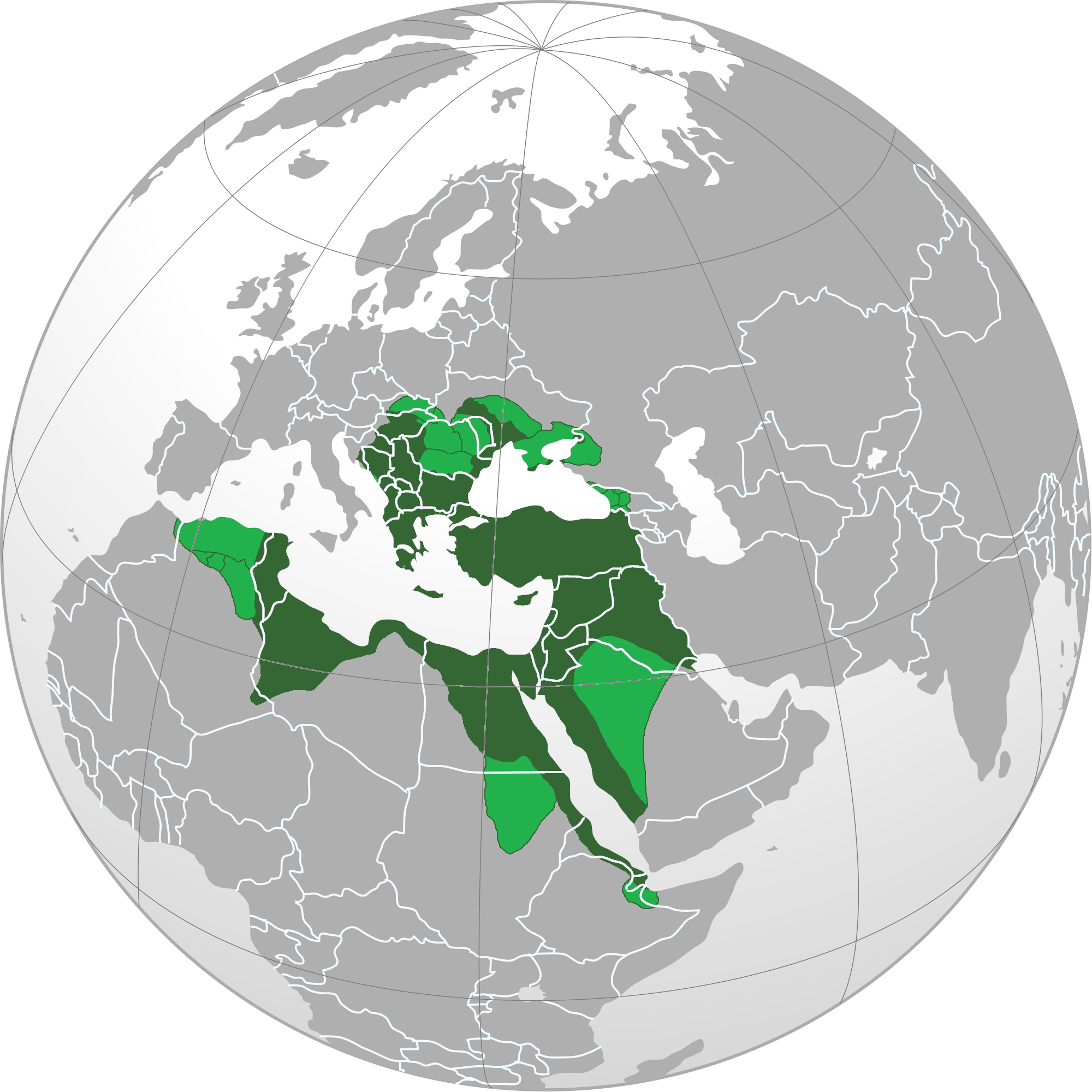
The Ottoman Empire reached its greatest extent in Europe in 1683, under Sultan Mehmed IV and the Köprülü Grand Vizier Merzifonlu Kara Mustafa Pasha. Core territories are in dark green while vassals are in light green.

However, the 17th century was not an era of stagnation and decline, but a key period in which the Ottoman state and its structures began to adapt to new pressures and new realities, internal and external. The Sultanate of women (1534–1683) was a period in which the political influence of the Imperial Harem was dominant, as the mothers of young sultans exercised power on behalf of their sons. This was not wholly unprecedented; Hürrem Sultan, who established herself in the early 1530s as the successor of Hafsa, the first valide sultan, was described by the Venetian baylo Andrea Giritti as "a woman of the utmost goodness, courage and wisdom" even though she "thwarted some while rewarding others". But the inadequacy of Ibrahim I (1640–1648) and the minority accession of Mehmed IV in 1646 created a significant crisis of rule, which the dominant women of the Imperial Harem filled. The most prominent women of this period were Kösem Sultan and her daughter-in-law Turhan Hatice, whose political rivalry culminated in Kösem's murder in 1651.

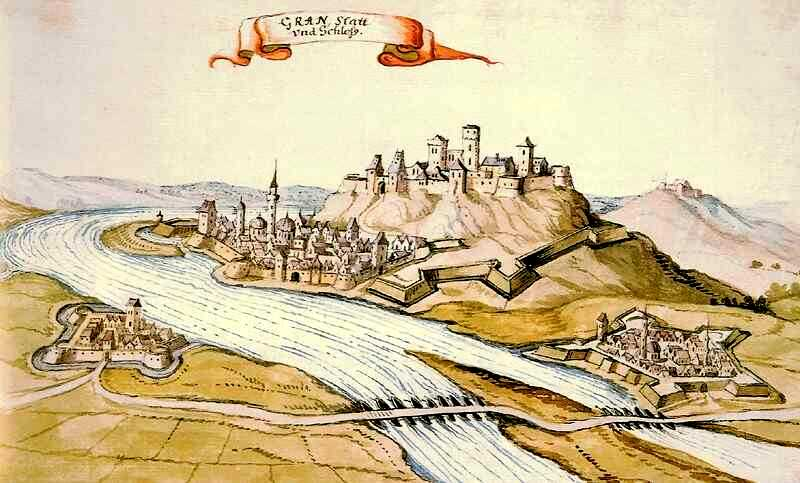
Ottoman city of Estergon in 1664.

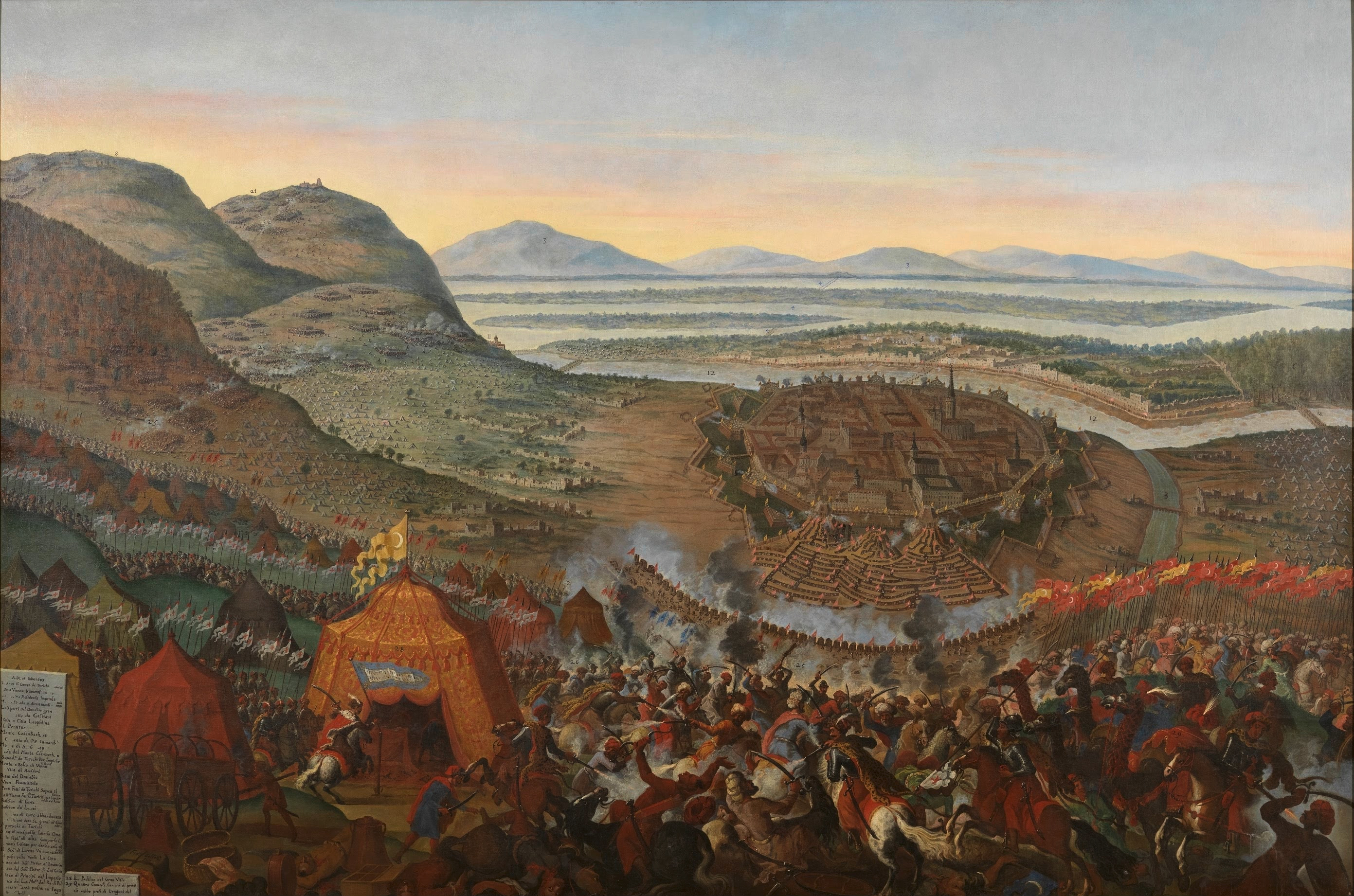
Second Siege of Vienna in 1683, painting by Frans Geffels.

This period gave way to the highly significant Köprülü Era (1656–1703), during which effective control of the Empire was exercised by a sequence of Grand Viziers from the Köprülü family. On 15 September 1656 the octogenarian Köprülü Mehmed Pasha accepted the seals of office having received guarantees from the Valide Turhan Hatice of unprecedented authority and freedom from interference. A fierce conservative disciplinarian, he successfully reasserted the central authority and the empire's military impetus. This continued under his son and successor Köprülü Fazıl Ahmed (Grand Vizier 1661–1676). The Köprülü Vizierate saw renewed military success with authority restored in Transylvania, the conquest of Crete completed in 1669 and expansion into Polish southern Ukraine, with the strongholds of Khotyn and Kamianets-Podilskyi and the territory of Podolia ceding to Ottoman control in 1676.

This period of renewed assertiveness came to a calamitous end when Grand Vizier Kara Mustafa Pasha in May 1683 led a huge army to attempt a second Ottoman siege of Vienna in the Great Turkish War of 1683–1699. The final assault being fatally delayed, the Ottoman forces were swept away by allied Habsburg, German and Polish forces spearheaded by the Polish king Jan at the Battle of Vienna.

The alliance of the Holy League pressed home the advantage of the defeat at Vienna and, thus, fifteen (15) years of see-sawing warfare, culminated in the epochal Treaty of Karlowitz (26 January 1699), which ended the Great Turkish War. For the first time, the Ottoman Empire surrendered control of significant European territories (many permanently), including Ottoman Hungary. The Empire had reached the end of its ability to effectively conduct an assertive, expansionist policy against its European rivals and it was to be forced from this point to adopt an essentially defensive strategy within this theatre.

Only two Sultans in this period personally exercised strong political and military control of the Empire: the vigorous Murad IV (1612–1640) recaptured Yerevan (1635) and Baghdad (1639) from the Safavids and reasserted central authority, albeit during a brief majority reign. Mustafa II (1695–1703) led the Ottoman counterattack of 1695–96 against the Habsburgs in Hungary, but was undone at the disastrous defeat at Zenta (11 September 1697).

== Stagnation and reform (1700–1827) ==
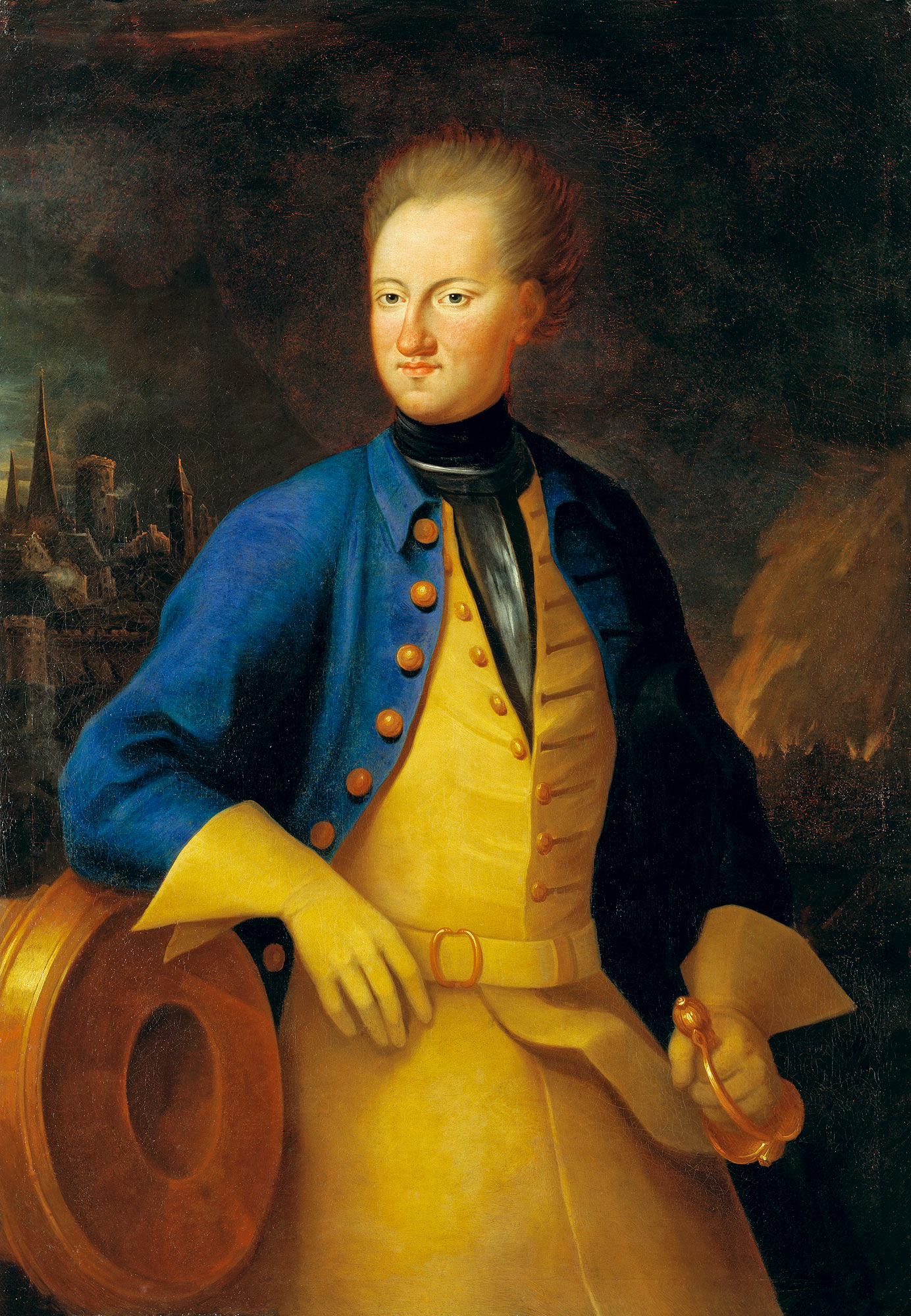
King Charles XII of Sweden fled to the Ottoman Empire following his defeat against the Russians at the Battle of Poltava in 1709.

During this period threats to the Ottoman Empire were presented by the traditional foe—the Austrian Empire—as well as by a new foe—the rising Russian Empire. Certain areas of the Empire, such as Egypt and Algeria, became independent in all but name, and later came under the influence of Britain and France. Later, in the 18th century, centralized authority within the Ottoman Empire gave way to varying degrees of provincial autonomy enjoyed by local governors and leaders.

However, Russian expansion presented a large and growing threat. Accordingly, King Charles XII of Sweden was welcomed as an ally in the Ottoman Empire following his defeat by the Russians at the Battle of Poltava in 1709 (part of the Great Northern War of 1700–1721.) Charles XII persuaded the Ottoman Sultan Ahmed III to declare war on Russia, which resulted in the Ottoman victory at the Pruth River Campaign of 1710–1711. Following the Austro-Turkish War (1716–1718), the subsequent Treaty of Passarowitz signed on 21 July 1718, brought a period of peace between wars. However, the Treaty also revealed that the Ottoman Empire was on the defensive and unlikely to present any further aggression in Europe.

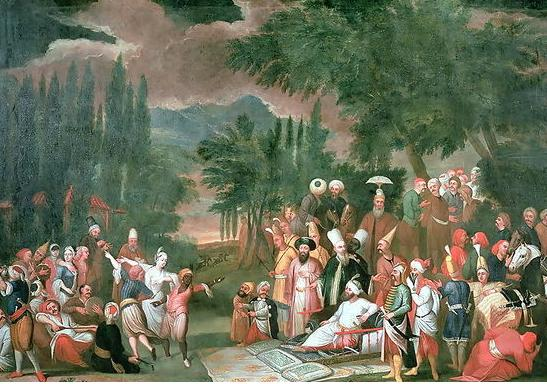
A Turkish hunting party with Ahmed III. Painting by Jean-Baptiste van Mour.

During the Tulip Era (1718–1730), named for Sultan Ahmed III's love of the tulip flower and its use to symbolize his peaceful reign, the Empire's policy towards Europe underwent a shift. The Empire began to improve the fortifications of its cities in the Balkan peninsula to act as a defence against European expansionism. Cultural works, fine arts and architecture flourished, with more elaborate styles that were influenced by the Baroque and Rococo movements in Europe. A classic example is the Fountain of Ahmed III in front of the Topkapı Palace. The famous Flemish-French painter Jean-Baptiste van Mour visited the Ottoman Empire during the Tulip Era and crafted some of the most renowned works of art depicting scenes from daily life in the Ottoman society and the imperial court.

Upon the death of Peter the Great in 1725, Catherine, Peter's wife succeeded to the throne of the Russian Empire as Czarina Catherine I. Together with Austria, Russia, under Empress Anne, Catherine I's niece, engaged in a war against the Ottoman Empire from 1735 until 1739. The Treaty of Belgrade signed on 18 September 1739, ended this war and resulted in Ottoman recovery of Belgrade and other territories from Austria, but the loss of the port of Azov to the Russians. However following the Treaty of Belgrade, the Ottoman Empire was able to enjoy a generation of peace as Austria and Russia were forced to deal with the rise of the Prussians under King Frederick the Great.

This long period of Ottoman peace and, indeed, stagnation is typically characterized by historians as an era of failed reforms. In the latter part of this period there were educational and technological reforms, including the establishment of higher education institutions such as the Istanbul Technical University. Ottoman science and technology had been highly regarded in medieval times, as a result of Ottoman scholars' synthesis of classical learning with Islamic philosophy and mathematics, and knowledge of such Chinese advances in technology as gunpowder and the magnetic compass. By this period, though, the influences had become regressive and conservative. In 1734, when an artillery school was established with French teachers in order to impart Western-style artillery methods, the Islamic clergy successfully objected under the grounds of theodicy. Not until 1754 was the artillery school reopened on a semi-secret basis. Earlier, the guilds of writers had denounced the printing press as "the Devil's Invention", and were responsible for a 53-year lag between its invention by Johannes Gutenberg in Europe in c. 1440 and its introduction to the Ottoman society with the first Gutenberg press in Istanbul that was established by the Sephardic Jews of Spain in 1493 (who had migrated to the Ottoman Empire a year earlier, escaping from the Spanish Inquisition of 1492.) However, the printing press was used only by the non-Muslims in the Ottoman Empire until the 18th century. In 1726, Ibrahim Muteferrika convinced the Grand Vizier Nevşehirli Damat İbrahim Pasha, the Grand Mufti, and the clergy on the efficiency of the printing press, and later submitted a request to Sultan Ahmed III, who granted Muteferrika the permission to publish non-religious books (despite opposition from some calligraphers and religious leaders.) Muteferrika's press published its first book in 1729, and, by 1743, issued 17 works in 23 volumes (each having between 500 and 1,000 copies.)

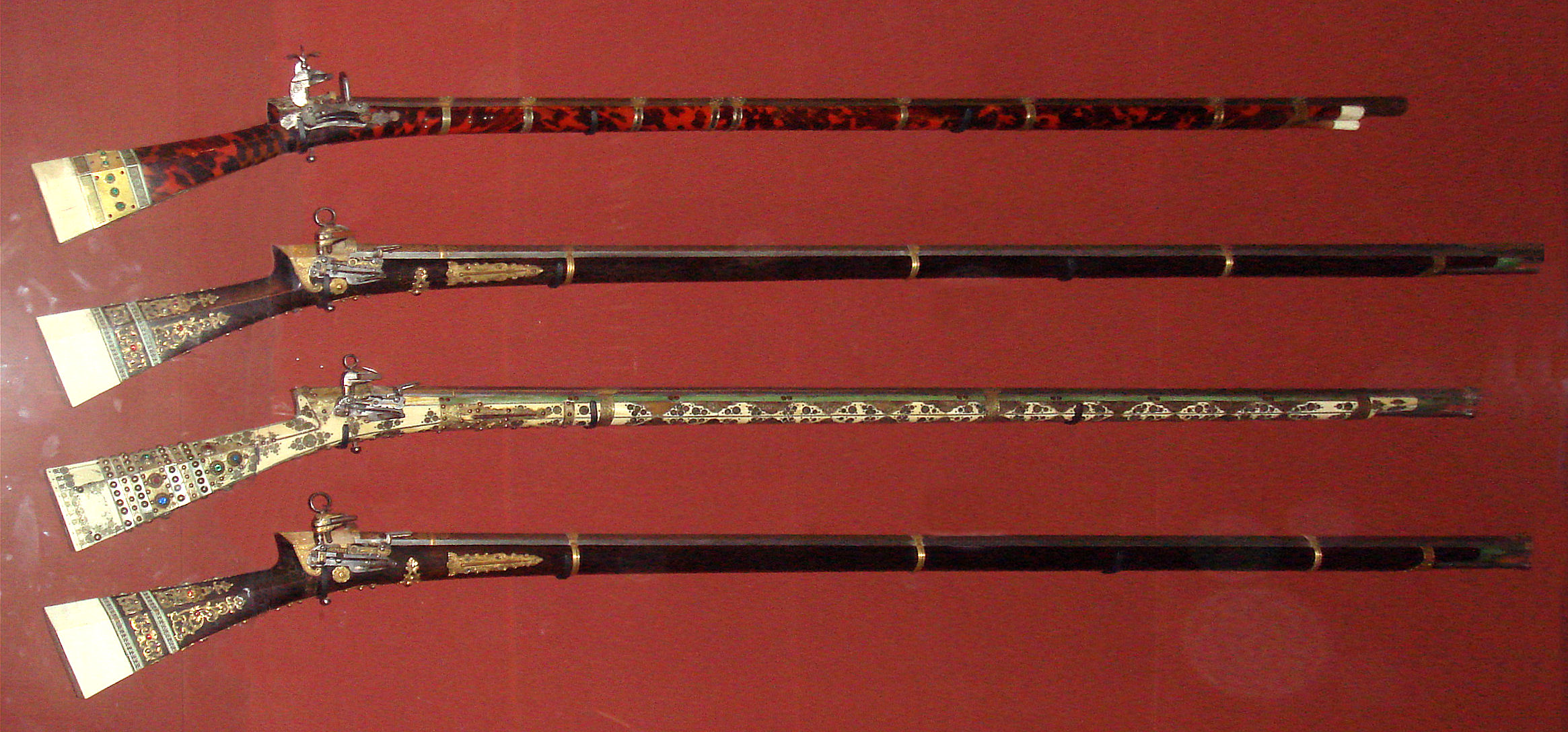
18th-century Turkish guns with miquelet locks, c. 1750–1800.

Other tentative reforms were also enacted: taxes were lowered, there were attempts to improve the image of the Ottoman state, and the first instances of private investment and entrepreneurship occurred.

Following the period of peace, which had lasted since 1739, Russia began to assert its expansionistic desires again in 1768. Under the pretext of pursuing fugitive Polish revolutionaries, Russian troops entered Balta an Ottoman-controlled city on the border of Bessarabia and massacred its citizens and burned the town to the ground. This action provoked the Ottoman Empire into the Russo-Turkish War (1768–1774), during which, in January 1769, a 70-thousand Turkish-Tatar army led by the Crimean Khan Qırım Giray made one of the largest slave raids in the history, which was repulsed by the 6-thousand garrison of the Fortress of St. Elizabeth, which prevented Ottoman Empire from further progress. After that, the Ottomans were pushed back to the shores of the Black Sea by the troops of General Rumyantsev. The Treaty of Küçük Kaynarca of 1774 ended the Russo-Turkish War (1768-1774) and allowed that the Christian citizens of the Ottoman-controlled Rumanian provinces of Wallachia and Moldavia would be allowed freedom to worship. Russia was made the guarantor of their right to Christian worship.

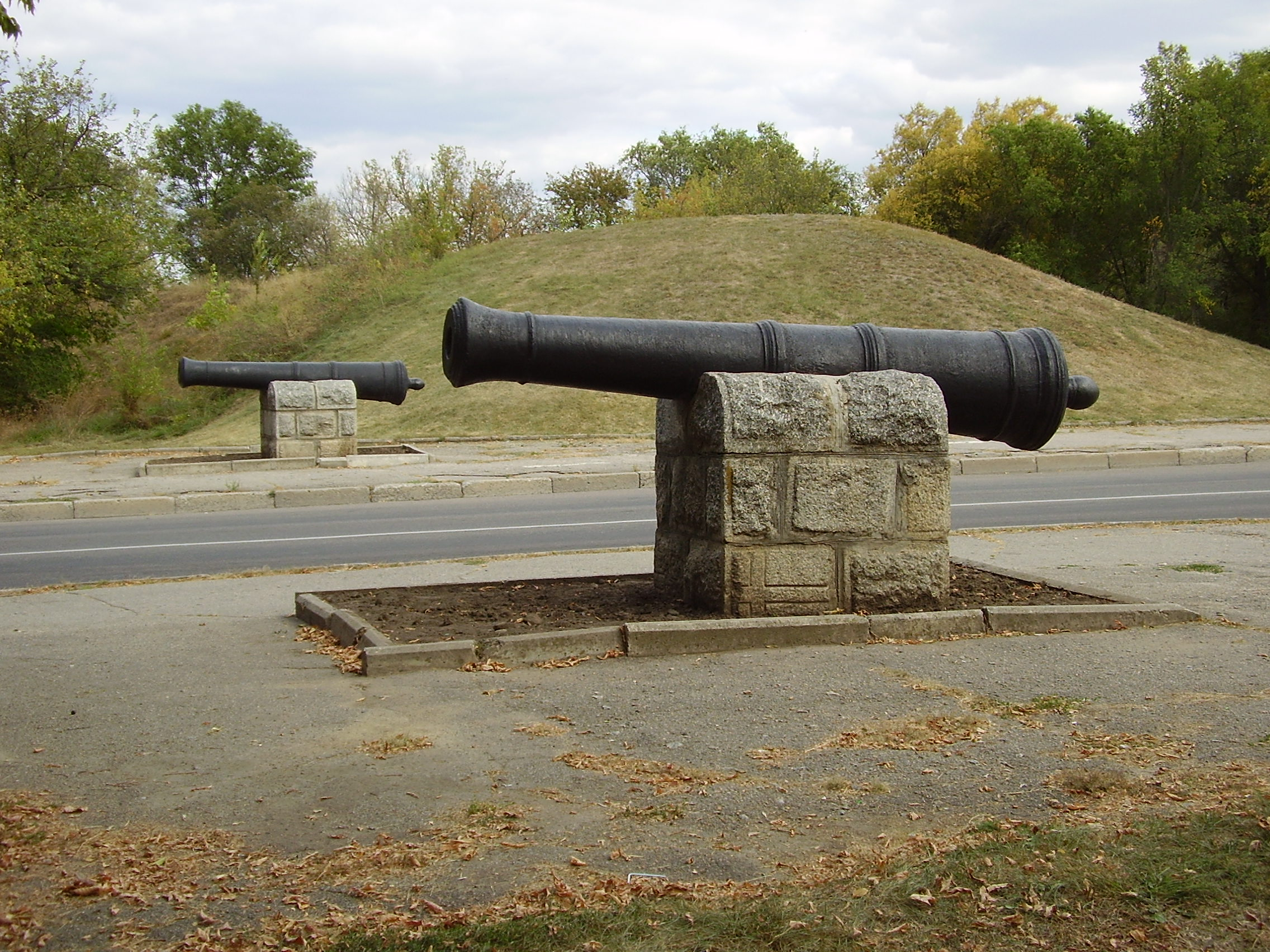
Cannons and earthworks of the Fortress of St. Elizabeth in the city of Kropyvnytskyi

A series of wars were fought between the Russian and Ottoman empires from the 18th to the 19th century. By the late 18th century, a number of defeats in several wars with Russia led some people in the Ottoman Empire to conclude that the reforms of Peter the Great had given the Russians an edge, and the Ottomans would have to keep up with Western technology in order to avoid further defeats.

Ottoman military reform efforts begin with Selim III (1789–1807) who made the first major attempts to modernize the army along European lines. These efforts, however, were hampered by reactionary movements, partly from the religious leadership, but primarily from the Janissary corps, who had become anarchic and ineffectual. Jealous of their privileges and firmly opposed to change, they created a Janissary revolt. Selim's efforts cost him his throne and his life, but were resolved in spectacular and bloody fashion by his successor, the dynamic Mahmud II, who eliminated the Janissary corps in 1826.

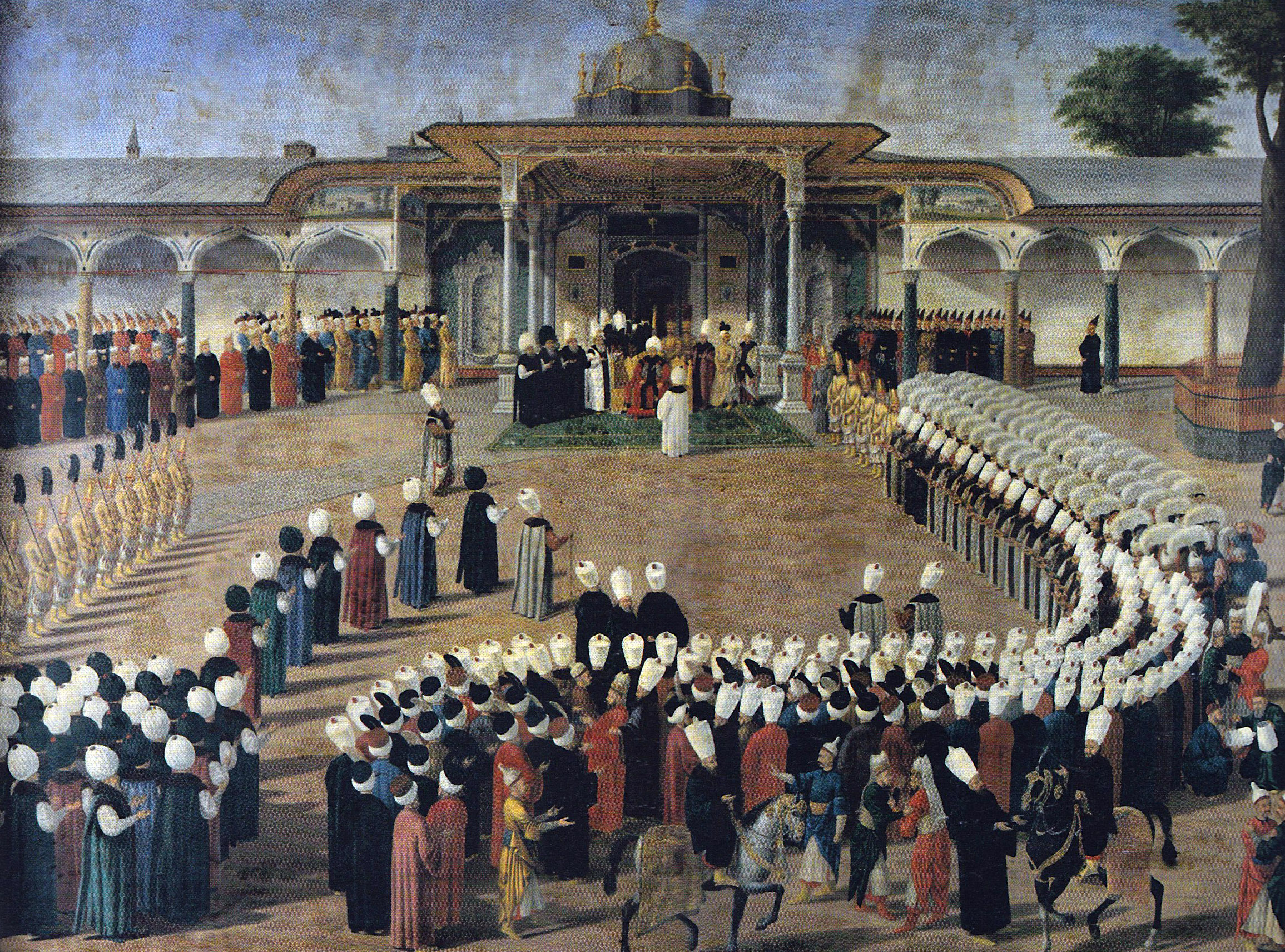
Selim III receiving dignitaries during an audience at the Gate of Felicity, Topkapı Palace.

The Serbian revolution (1804–1815) marked the beginning of an era of national awakening in the Balkans during the Eastern Question. Suzerainty of Serbia as a hereditary monarchy under its own dynasty was acknowledged de jure in 1830. In 1821, the Greeks declared war on the Sultan. A rebellion that originated in Moldavia as a diversion was followed by the main revolution in the Peloponnese, which, along with the northern part of the Gulf of Corinth, became the first parts of the Ottoman empire to achieve independence (in 1829). By the mid-19th century, the Ottoman Empire was called the "sick man" by Europeans. The suzerain states – the Principality of Serbia, Wallachia, Moldavia and Montenegro – moved towards de jure independence during the 1860s and 1870s.

=== International Trade ===
As regards trade imbalance, only Istanbul ran an import surplus. Both Lampe and McGowan argue that the empire as a whole, and the Balkans in particular, continued to record an export surplus throughout the period. As early as 1850, French authorities became concerned that imports of 27.3 million francs from the Ottoman Empire exceeded what France was exporting to them 19.9 million francs and were anxious to balance the two figures The balance of trade however moved against the Ottomans from the 18th century onwards. They would re-export high value luxury goods, mainly silks from the Far East and exported many of its own goods. Luxury goods began being imported. Through the 18th century, exports moved to unprocessed goods whilst at the same time commodities were imported from European colonies. Most of these commodities were produced by slave labor undercutting domestic production. However, according to most scholars, a favourable balance of trade still existed at the end of the 18th century. 19th century trade increased multi-fold, however exports remained similar to 18th century levels. Foodstuffs and raw materials were the focus with carpets and raw silk appearing in the 1850s.

From the 18th century onwards, foreign merchants and Ottoman non-Muslims became dominant in the growing international trade. With increasing affluence, their political significance grew especially in Syria. Muslim merchants however dominated internal trade and trade between the interior and coastal cities. In 1793, Aleppo alone issued 1,500 certificates to Ottoman non-Muslims for such privileges which through the course of the eighteenth century allowed them to replace their European counterparts. Istanbul boasted over 1,000 registered merchants in the early twentieth century, of which only 3% were British, French or German merchants;

== Decline and modernization (1828–1908) ==
During this period, the empire faced challenges in defending itself against foreign invasion and occupation. The empire ceased to enter conflicts on its own and began to forge alliances with European countries such as France, the Netherlands, Britain and Russia. As an example, in the 1853 Crimean War, the Ottomans united with Britain, France and the Kingdom of Sardinia against Russia.

=== Modernization ===
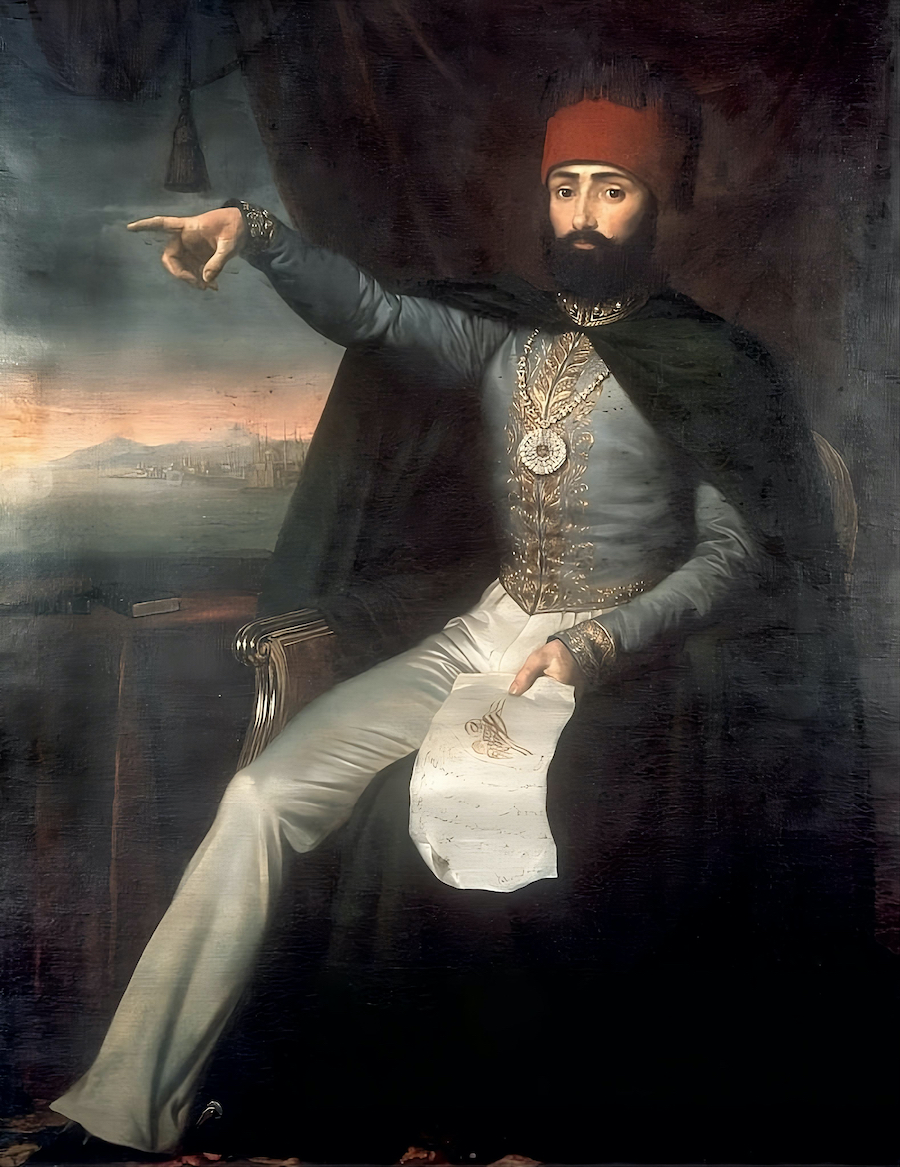
Mahmud II started the modernization of Turkey by paving the way for the Edict of Tanzimat in 1839.

During the Tanzimat period (from Arabic: تنظيم tanẓīm, meaning "organisation") (1839–76), the government's series of constitutional reforms led to a fairly modern conscripted army, banking system reforms, the replacement of religious law with secular law and guilds with modern factories. In 1856, the Hatt-ı Hümayun promised equality for all Ottoman citizens regardless of their ethnicity and religious confession; which thus widened the scope of the 1839 Hatt-ı Şerif of Gülhane.

Overall, the Tanzimat reforms had far-reaching effects. Those educated in the schools established during the Tanzimat period included Mustafa Kemal Atatürk and other progressive leaders and thinkers of the Republic of Turkey and of many other former Ottoman states in the Balkans, the Middle East and North Africa. These reforms included guarantees to ensure the Ottoman subjects perfect security for their lives, honour and property; the introduction of the first Ottoman paper banknotes (1840) and opening of the first post offices (1840); the reorganisation of the finance system according to the French model (1840); the reorganisation of the Civil and Criminal Code according to the French model (1840); the establishment of the Meclis-i Maarif-i Umumiye (1841) which was the prototype of the First Ottoman Parliament (1876); the reorganisation of the army and a regular method of recruiting, levying the army and fixing the duration of military service (1843–44); the adoption of an Ottoman national anthem and Ottoman national flag (1844); the first nationwide Ottoman census in 1844 (only male citizens were counted); the first national identity cards (officially named the Mecidiye identity papers, or informally kafa kağıdı (head paper) documents, 1844); the institution of a Council of Public Instruction (1845) and the Ministry of Education (Mekatib-i Umumiye Nezareti, 1847, which later became the Maarif Nezareti, 1857); the Disestablishment of the Istanbul Slave Market and the Suppression of the slave trade in the Persian Gulf (1847); the establishment of the first modern universities (darülfünun, 1848), academies (1848) and teacher schools (darülmuallimin, 1848); establishment of the Ministry of Healthcare (Tıbbiye Nezareti, 1850); the Commerce and Trade Code (1850); establishment of the Academy of Sciences (Encümen-i Daniş, 1851); establishment of the Şirket-i Hayriye which operated the first steam-powered commuter ferries (1851); the first European style courts (Meclis-i Ahkam-ı Adliye, 1853) and supreme judiciary council (Meclis-i Ali-yi Tanzimat, 1853); establishment of the modern Municipality of Istanbul (Şehremaneti, 1854); the Prohibition of the Circassian and Georgian slave trade (1854–1855); the City Planning Council (İntizam-ı Şehir Komisyonu, 1855); the abolition of the capitation (Jizya) tax on non-Muslims, with a regular method of establishing and collecting taxes (1856); non-Muslims were allowed to become soldiers (1856); various provisions for the better administration of the public service and advancement of commerce; the establishment of the first telegraph networks (1847–1855) and railways (1856); the replacement of guilds with factories; the establishment of the Ottoman Central Bank (originally established as the Bank-ı Osmanî in 1856, and later reorganised as the Bank-ı Osmanî-i Şahane in 1863) and the Ottoman Stock Exchange (Dersaadet Tahvilat Borsası, established in 1866); the Land Code (Arazi Kanunnamesi, 1857); permission for private sector publishers and printing firms with the Serbesti-i Kürşad Nizamnamesi (1857); establishment of the School of Economical and Political Sciences (Mekteb-i Mülkiye, 1859); the Press and Journalism Regulation Code (Matbuat Nizamnamesi, 1864); among others.

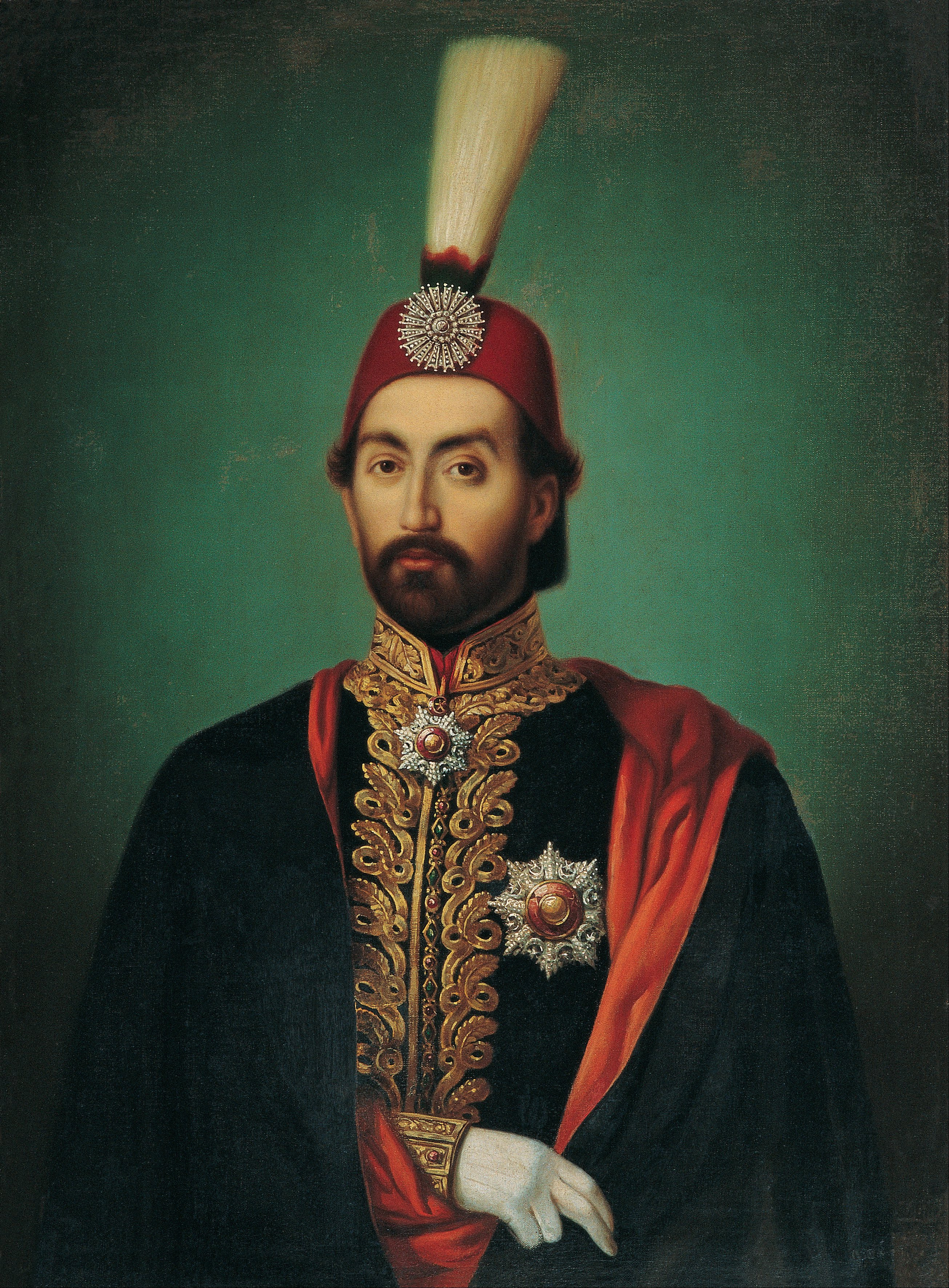
The reign of Sultan Abdülmecid was marked by the implementation of the Tanzimat reforms; the Crimean War and first foreign debt of the Ottoman Empire in 1854.

The Ottoman Ministry of Post was established in Istanbul on 23 October 1840. The first post office was the Postahane-i Amire near the courtyard of the Yeni Mosque. In 1876 the first international mailing network between Istanbul and the lands beyond the vast Ottoman Empire was established. In 1901 the first money transfers were made through the post offices and the first cargo services became operational.

Samuel Morse received his first ever patent for the telegraph in 1847, at the old Beylerbeyi Palace (the present Beylerbeyi Palace was built in 1861–1865 on the same location) in Istanbul, which was issued by Sultan Abdülmecid who personally tested the new invention. Following this successful test, installation works of the first telegraph line (Istanbul-Adrianople–Şumnu) began on 9 August 1847. In 1855 the Ottoman telegraph network became operational and the Telegraph Administration was established. In 1871 the Ministry of Post and the Telegraph Administration were merged, becoming the Ministry of Post and Telegraph. In July 1881 the first telephone circuit in Istanbul was established between the Ministry of Post and Telegraph in the Soğukçeşme quarter and the Postahane-i Amire in the Yenicami quarter. On 23 May 1909, the first manual telephone exchange with a 50 line capacity entered service in the Büyük Postane (Grand Post Office) in Sirkeci.

The reformist period peaked with the Constitution, called the Kanûn-u Esâsî (meaning "Basic Law" in Ottoman Turkish), written by members of the Young Ottomans, which was promulgated on 23 November 1876. It established the freedom of belief and equality of all citizens before the law. The empire's First Constitutional era, was short-lived. But the idea of Ottomanism proved influential. A group of reformers known as the Young Ottomans, primarily educated in Western universities, believed that a constitutional monarchy would give an answer to the empire's growing social unrest. Through a military coup in 1876, they forced Sultan Abdülaziz (1861–1876) to abdicate in favour of Murad V. However, Murad V was mentally ill and was deposed within a few months. His heir-apparent, Abdülhamid II (1876–1909), was invited to assume power on the condition that he would declare a constitutional monarchy, which he did on 23 November 1876. The parliament survived for only two years before the sultan suspended it. When forced to reconvene it, he abolished the representative body instead. This ended the effectiveness of the Kanûn-ı Esâsî.

The Christian millets gained privileges, such as in the Armenian National Constitution of 1863. This Divan-approved form of the Code of Regulations consisted of 150 articles drafted by the Armenian intelligentsia. Another institution was the newly formed Armenian National Assembly. The Christian population of the empire, owing to their higher educational levels, started to pull ahead of the Muslim majority, leading to much resentment on the part of the latter. In 1861, there were 571 primary and 94 secondary schools for Ottoman Christians with 140,000 pupils in total, a figure that vastly exceeded the number of Muslim children in school at the same time, who were further hindered by the amount of time spent learning Arabic and Islamic theology. In turn, the higher educational levels of the Christians allowed them to play a large role in the economy. In 1911, of the 654 wholesale companies in Istanbul, 528 were owned by ethnic Greeks.

==== Railways ====
New railways were built during this period, including the first in the Ottoman Empire.

Railway	Year established	Cities serviced
Cairo–Alexandria line	1856	Cairo–Alexandria
İzmir–Selçuk–Aydın line	1856	İzmir–Selçuk–Aydın
Köstence–Boğazköy railway line	1860	Köstence–Boğazköy
Smyrne Cassaba & Prolongements	1863	İzmir, Afyon, Bandırma
Rusçuk–Varna railway line	1866	Rusçuk, Varna
Bükreş–Yergöğü railway line	1869	Bükreş, Yergöğü
Chemins de fer Orientaux	1869	Vienna, Banja Luka, Saraybosna, Niš, Sofia, Filibe, Adrianople and Istanbul (starting from 1889 between Paris and Istanbul as the Orient Express)
Chemin de Fer Moudania Brousse	1871	Mudanya, Bursa
Istanbul-Belovo railway line	1873	Istanbul, Belovo
Üsküp–Selânik railway line	1873	Üsküp, Selânik
Mersin-Tarsus-Adana Railway	1882	Mersin, Tarsus, Adana
Chemins de Fer Ottomans d'Anatolie	1888	Istanbul, İzmit, Adapazarı, Bilecik, Eskişehir, Ankara, Kütahya, Konya
Jaffa–Jerusalem railway	1892	Jaffa, Jerusalem
Beirut-Damascus railway	1895	Beirut, Damascus
Baghdad Railway	1904	Istanbul, Konya, Adana, Aleppo, Baghdad
Jezreel Valley railway	1905	Acre, Haifa, Bosra, Hauran, Yagur, Daraa, Samakh, Beit She'an, Silat ad-Dhahr
Hejaz Railway	1908	Istanbul, Konya, Adana, Aleppo, Damascus, Amman, Tabuk and Medina
Eastern Railway	1915	Tulkarm, Lod
Beersheba Railway	1915	Nahal Sorek, Beit Hanoun, Beersheba.

=== Crimean War ===
The Crimean War (1853–1856) was part of a long-running contest between the major European powers for influence over territories of the declining Ottoman Empire. Britain and France successfully defended the Ottoman Empire against Russia.

Most of the fighting took place when the allies landed on Russia's Crimean Peninsula to gain control of the Black Sea. There were smaller campaigns in western Anatolia, the Caucasus, the Baltic Sea, the Pacific Ocean and the White Sea. It was one of the first "modern" wars, as it introduced new technologies to warfare, such as the first tactical use of railways and the telegraph. The subsequent Treaty of Paris (1856) secured Ottoman control over the Balkan Peninsula and the Black Sea basin. That lasted until defeat in the Russo-Turkish War of 1877–1878.

The Ottoman Empire took its first foreign loans on 4 August 1854, shortly after the beginning of the Crimean War.

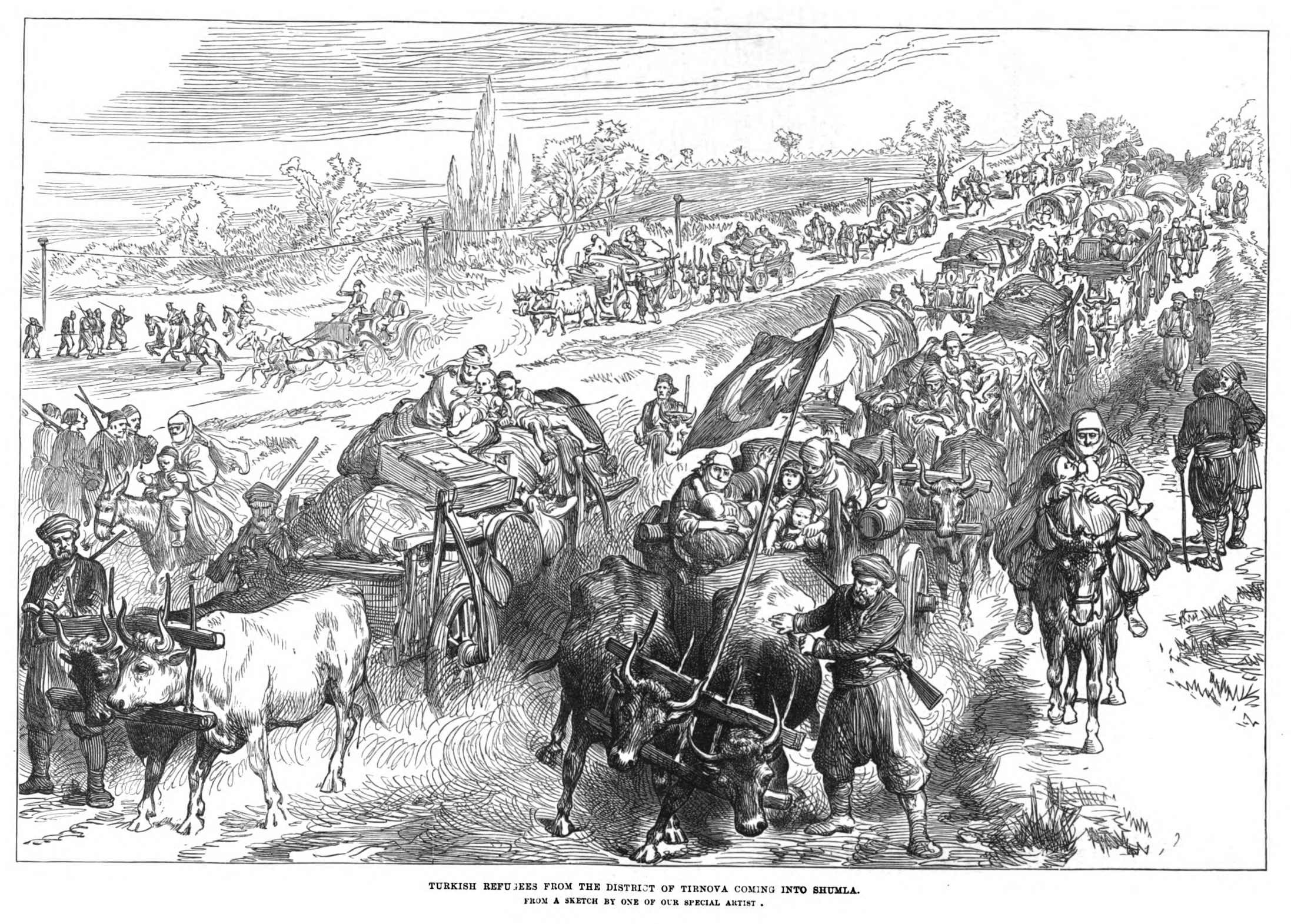
Turkish refugees from Bulgaria, 1877.

The war caused an exodus of the Crimean Tatars. From the total Tatar population of 300,000 in the Tauride Province, about 200,000 Crimean Tatars moved to the Ottoman Empire in continuing waves of emigration. Toward the end of the Caucasian Wars, 90% of the Circassians were exiled from their homelands in the Caucasus and settled in the Ottoman Empire. Since the 19th century, the exodus to present-day Turkey by the large portion of Muslim peoples from the Balkans, Caucasus, Crimea and Crete, had great influence in molding the country's fundamental features. These people were called Muhacir under a general definition. By the time the Ottoman Empire came to an end in 1922, half of the urban population of Turkey was descended from Muslim refugees from Russia. Crimean Tatar refugees in the late 19th century played an especially notable role in seeking to modernise Turkish education.

=== Ethnic nationalism ===
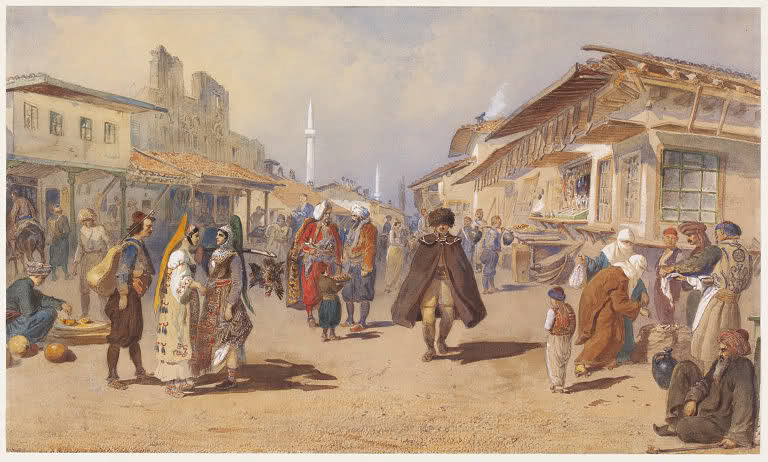
Belgrade, 19th century

The rise of nationalism swept through many countries during the 19th century, and it affected territories within the Ottoman Empire. A burgeoning national consciousness, together with a growing sense of ethnic nationalism, made nationalistic thought one of the most significant Western ideas imported to the Ottoman Empire. It was forced to deal with nationalism both within and beyond its borders. The number of revolutionary political parties rose dramatically. Uprisings in Ottoman territory had many far-reaching consequences during the 19th century and determined much of Ottoman policy during the early 20th century. Many Ottoman Turks questioned whether the policies of the state were to blame: some felt that the sources of ethnic conflict were external, and unrelated to issues of governance. While this era was not without some successes, the ability of the Ottoman state to have any effect on ethnic uprisings was seriously called into question.

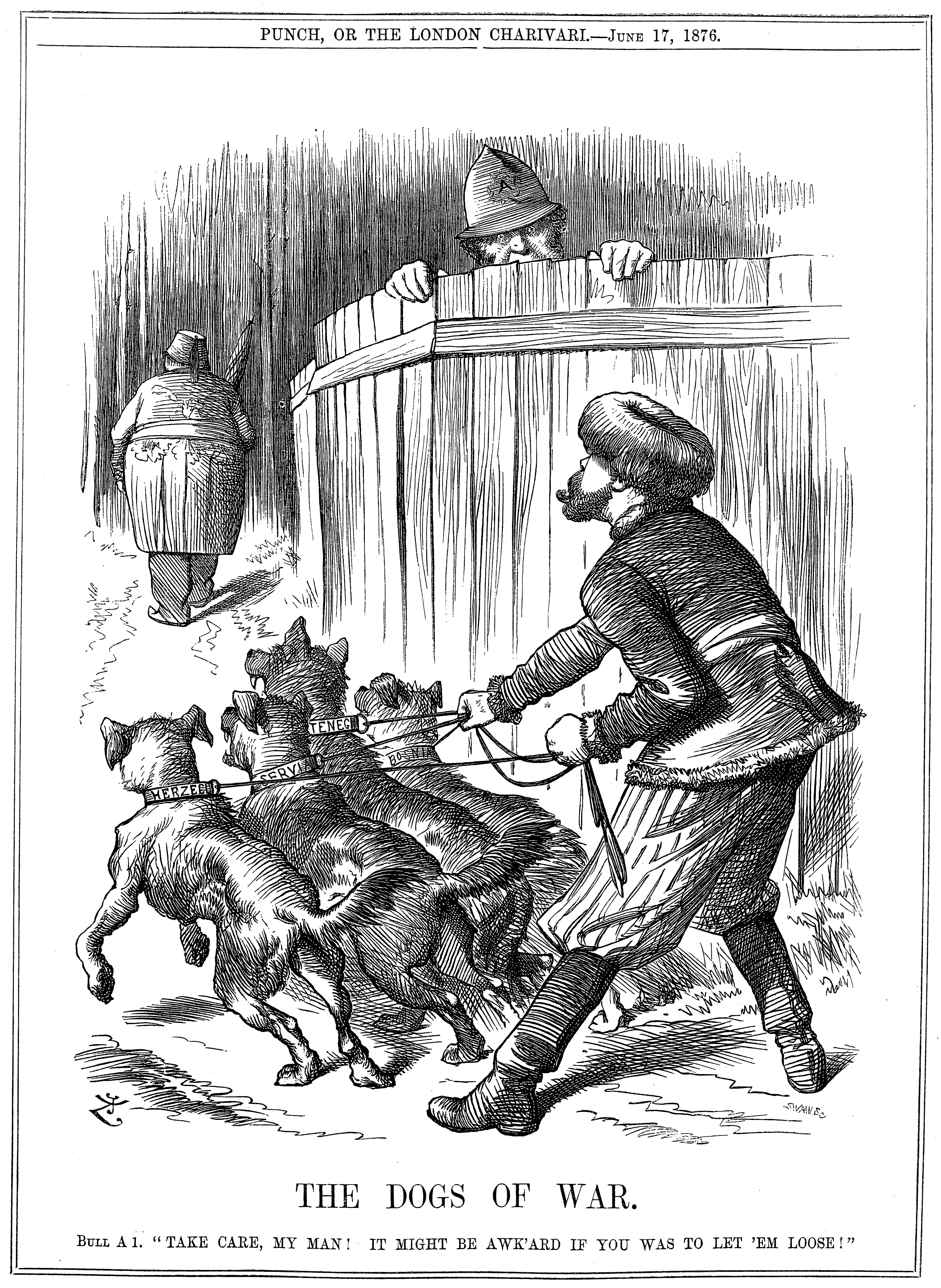
Punch cartoon from 17 June 1876. Russian Empire preparing to let slip the Balkan "Dogs of War" to attack the Ottoman Empire, while policeman John Bull (UK) warns Russia to take care.

In 1804 the Serbian Revolution against Ottoman rule erupted in the Balkans, running in parallel with the Napoleonic invasion. By 1817, when the revolution ended, Serbia was raised to the status of self-governing monarchy under nominal Ottoman suzerainty. In 1821 the First Hellenic Republic became the first Balkan country to achieve its independence from the Ottoman Empire. It was officially recognised by the Porte in 1829, after the end of the Greek War of Independence.

=== Balkans ===
The Tanzimat reforms did not halt the rise of nationalism in the Danubian Principalities and the Principality of Serbia, which had been semi-independent for almost six decades. In 1875, the tributary principalities of Serbia and Montenegro, and the United Principalities of Wallachia and Moldavia, unilaterally declared their independence from the empire. Following the Russo-Turkish War of 1877–1878, the empire granted independence to all three belligerent nations. Bulgaria also achieved independence (as the Principality of Bulgaria); its volunteers had participated in the Russo-Turkish War on the side of the rebelling nations.

==== Congress of Berlin ====
Map of the Ottoman Empire in 1900, with the names of the Ottoman provinces between 1878 and 1908.

The Congress of Berlin (13 June – 13 July 1878) was a meeting of the leading statesmen of Europe's Great Powers and the Ottoman Empire. In the wake of the Russo-Turkish War (1877–1878) that ended with a decisive victory for Russia and her Orthodox Christian allies (subjects of the Ottoman Empire before the war) in the Balkan Peninsula, the urgent need was to stabilise and reorganise the Balkans, and set up new nations. German Chancellor Otto von Bismarck, who led the Congress, undertook to adjust boundaries to minimise the risks of major war, while recognising the reduced power of the Ottomans, and balance the distinct interests of the great powers.

As a result, Ottoman holdings in Europe declined sharply; Bulgaria was established as an independent principality inside the Ottoman Empire, but was not allowed to keep all its previous territory. Bulgaria lost Eastern Rumelia, which was restored to the Turks under a special administration; and Macedonia, which was returned outright to the Turks, who promised reform. Romania achieved full independence, but had to turn over part of Bessarabia to Russia. Serbia and Montenegro finally gained complete independence, but with smaller territories.

In 1878, Austria-Hungary unilaterally occupied the Ottoman provinces of Bosnia-Herzegovina and Novi Pazar, but the Ottoman government contested this move and maintained its troops in both provinces. The stalemate lasted for 30 years (Austrian and Ottoman forces coexisted in Bosnia and Novi Pazar for three decades) until 1908, when the Austrians took advantage of the political turmoil in the Ottoman Empire that stemmed from the Young Turk Revolution and annexed Bosnia-Herzegovina, but pulled their troops out of Novi Pazar in order to reach a compromise and avoid a war with the Turks.

In return for British Prime Minister Benjamin Disraeli's advocacy for restoring the Ottoman territories on the Balkan Peninsula during the Congress of Berlin, Britain assumed the administration of Cyprus in 1878 and later sent troops to Egypt in 1882 with the pretext of helping the Ottoman government to put down the Urabi Revolt; effectively gaining control in both territories (Britain formally annexed the still nominally Ottoman territories of Cyprus and Egypt on 5 November 1914, in response to the Ottoman Empire's decision to enter World War I on the side of the Central Powers.) France, on its part, occupied Tunisia in 1881.

The results were first hailed as a great achievement in peacemaking and stabilisation. However, most of the participants were not fully satisfied, and grievances regarding the results festered until they exploded into world war in 1914. Serbia, Bulgaria and Greece made gains, but far less than they thought they deserved. The Ottoman Empire, called at the time the "sick man of Europe", was humiliated and significantly weakened, rendering it more liable to domestic unrest and more vulnerable to attack. Although Russia had been victorious in the war that occasioned the conference, it was humiliated at Berlin, and resented its treatment. Austria gained a great deal of territory, which angered the South Slavs, and led to decades of tensions in Bosnia and Herzegovina. Bismarck became the target of hatred of Russian nationalists and Pan-Slavists, and found that he had tied Germany too closely to Austria in the Balkans.

In the long-run, tensions between Russia and Austria-Hungary intensified, as did the nationality question in the Balkans. The Congress succeeded in keeping Istanbul in Ottoman hands. It effectively disavowed Russia's victory. The Congress of Berlin returned to the Ottoman Empire territories that the previous treaty had given to the Principality of Bulgaria, most notably Macedonia, thus setting up a strong revanchist demand in Bulgaria that in 1912 led to the First Balkan War in which the Turks were defeated and lost nearly all of Europe. As the Ottoman Empire gradually shrank in size, military power and wealth, many Balkan Muslims migrated to the empire's remaining territory in the Balkans or to the heartland in Anatolia. Muslims had been the majority in some parts of the Ottoman Empire such as the Crimea, the Balkans and the Caucasus as well as a plurality in southern Russia and also in some parts of Romania. Most of these lands were lost with time by the Ottoman Empire between the 19th and 20th centuries. By 1923, only Anatolia and eastern Thrace remained Muslim land.

=== Egypt ===
After gaining some amount of autonomy during the early 1800s, Egypt had entered into a period of political turmoil by the 1880s. In April 1882, British and French warships appeared in Alexandria to support the khedive and prevent the country from falling into the hands of anti-European nationals. In August 1882 British forces invaded and occupied Egypt on the pretext of bringing order. The British supported Khedive Tewfiq and restored stability which was especially beneficial to British and French financial interests. Egypt and Sudan remained as Ottoman provinces de jure until 1914, when the Ottoman Empire joined the Central Powers of World War I. Great Britain officially annexed these two provinces and Cyprus in response. Other Ottoman provinces in North Africa were lost between 1830 and 1912, starting with Algeria (occupied by France in 1830), Tunisia (occupied by France in 1881) and Libya (occupied by Italy in 1912).

=== Armenians ===
Although granted their own constitution and national assembly with the Tanzimat reforms, the Armenians attempted to demand implementation of Article 61 from the Ottoman government as agreed upon at the Congress of Berlin in 1878. Following pressure from the European powers and Armenians, Sultan Abdul Hamid II, in response, assigned the Hamidiye regiments to eastern Anatolia (Ottoman Armenia). These were formed mostly of irregular cavalry units of recruited Kurds. From 1894 to 1896, between 100,000 and 300,000 Armenians living throughout the empire were killed in what became known as the Hamidian massacres. Armenian militants seized the Ottoman Bank headquarters in Istanbul in 1896 to bring European attention to the massacres, but they failed to gain any help.

== Defeat and dissolution (1908–1922) ==
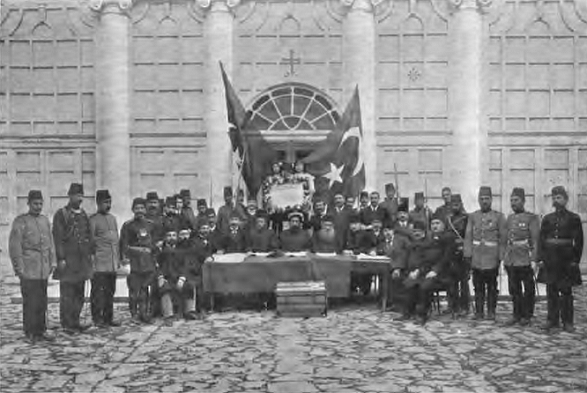
Declaration of the Young Turk Revolution by the leaders of the Ottoman millets.

The Ottoman Empire had long been the "sick man of Europe" and after a series of Balkan wars by 1914 had been driven out of nearly all of Europe and North Africa. It still controlled 28 million people, of whom 17 million were in modern-day Turkey, 3 million in Syria, Lebanon, and 2.5 million in Iraq. Another 5.5 million people were under nominal Ottoman rule in the Arabian peninsula.

The Second Constitutional Era began after the Young Turk Revolution (3 July 1908) with the sultan's announcement of the restoration of the 1876 constitution and the reconvening of the Ottoman Parliament. It marked the beginning of the dissolution of the Ottoman Empire. This era is dominated by the politics of the Committee of Union and Progress (CUP), and the movement that would become known as the Young Turks. Although it began as a uniting progressive party, the CUP splintered in 1911 with the founding of the opposition Freedom and Accord Party (Liberal Union or Entente), which poached many of the more liberal Deputies from the CUP. The remaining CUP members, who now took a more dominantly nationalist tone in the face of the enmity of the Balkan Wars, dueled Freedom and Accord in a series of power reversals, which ultimately led to the CUP (specifically its leadership, the "Three Pashas") seizing power from the Freedom and Accord in the 1913 Ottoman coup d'état and establishing total dominance over Ottoman politics until the end of World War I.

Profiting from the civil strife, Austria-Hungary officially annexed Bosnia and Herzegovina in 1908, but pulled its troops out of the Sanjak of Novi Pazar, another contested region between the Austrians and Ottomans, to avoid a war. During the Italo-Turkish War (1911–12) in which the Ottoman Empire lost Libya, the Balkan League declared war against the Ottoman Empire. The Empire lost the Balkan Wars (1912–13). It lost its Balkan territories except East Thrace and the historic Ottoman capital city of Adrianople during the war. Some 400,000 Muslims, out of fear of Greek, Serbian or Bulgarian atrocities, left with the retreating Ottoman army. The Baghdad Railway under German control was a proposal to build rail lines into Iraq. The railway was not actually built at this time but its prospect worried the British until that issue was resolved in 1914. The railway did not play a role in the origins of World War I.

=== World War I (1914–1918) ===
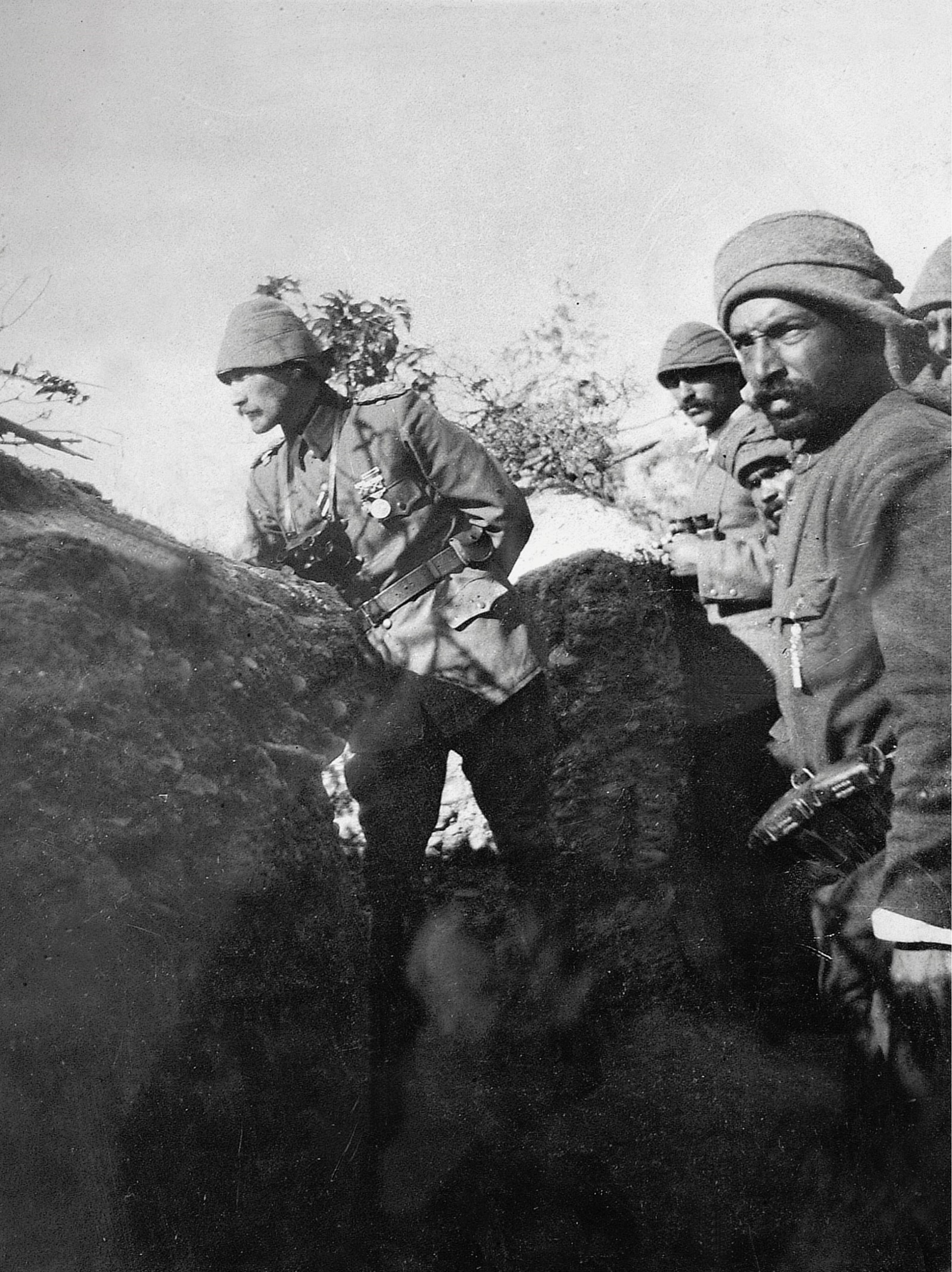
Mustafa Kemal (Atatürk) at the trenches of Gallipoli Campaign in 1915.

The Young Turk government had signed a secret treaty with Germany and established the Ottoman–German Alliance in August 1914, aimed against the common Russian enemy but aligning the Empire with the German side. The Ottoman Empire entered World War I after the Goeben and Breslau incident, in which it gave safe harbour to two German ships that were fleeing British ships. These ships then—after having officially been transferred to the Ottoman Navy, but effectively still under German control—attacked the Russian port of Sevastopol, thus dragging the Empire into the war on the side of the Central Powers, in which it took part in the Middle Eastern theatre. There were several important Ottoman victories in the early years of the war, such as the Battle of Gallipoli and the Siege of Kut, but there were setbacks as well, such as the disastrous Caucasus Campaign against the Russians. The United States never declared war against the Ottoman Empire.

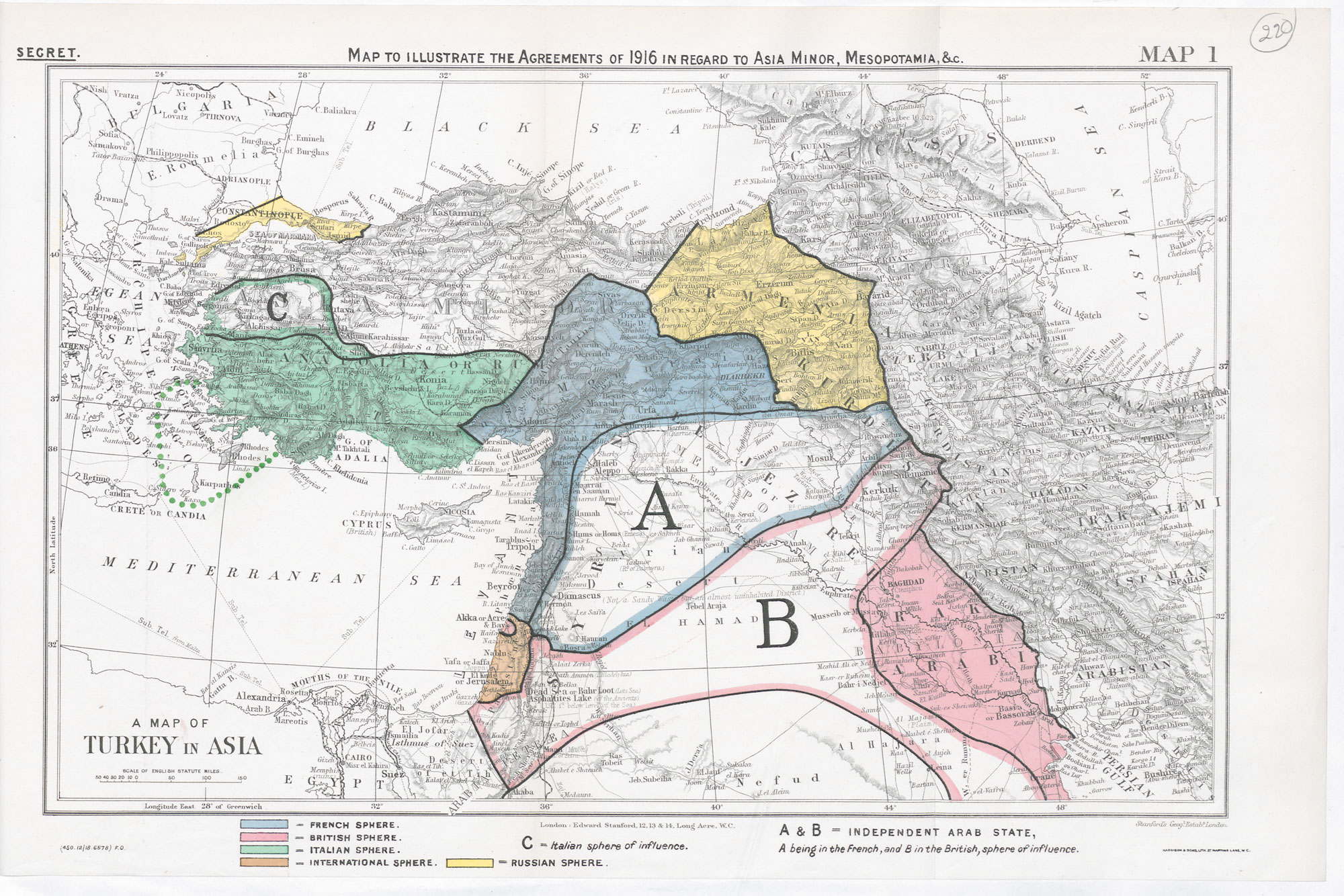
January 1919 British Foreign Office memorandum summarizing the wartime agreements between Britain, France, Italy and Russia regarding Ottoman territory.

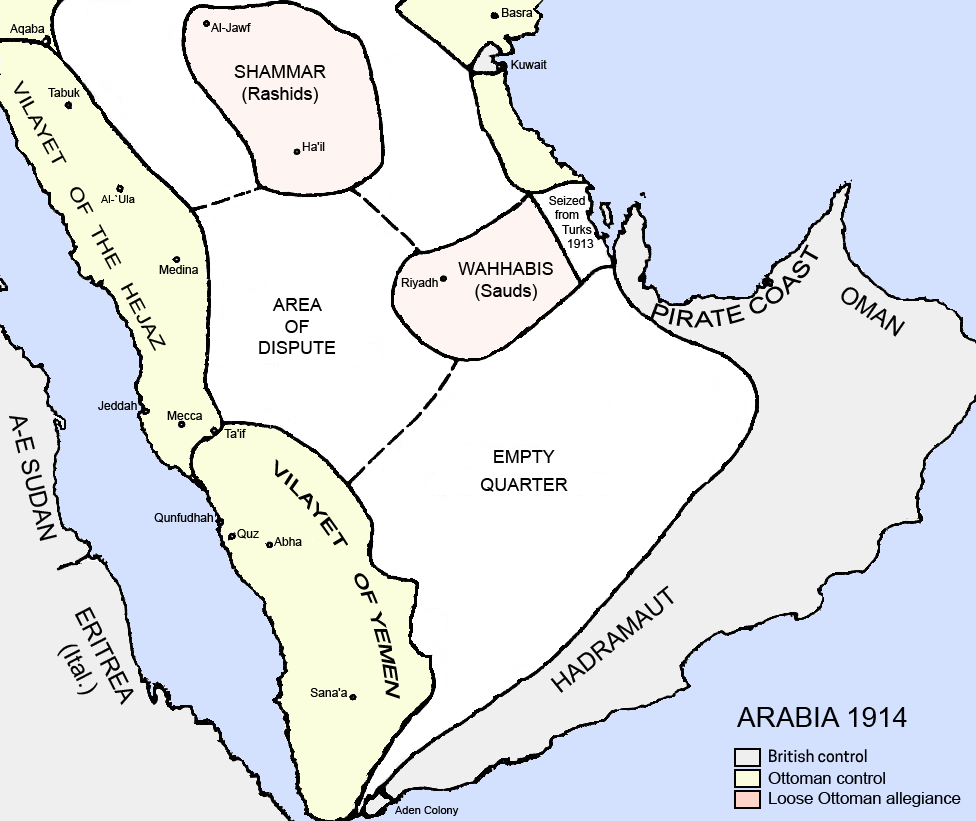
The Arabian peninsula in 1914

In 1915, as the Russian Caucasus Army continued to advance in eastern Anatolia with the help of Armenian volunteer units from the Caucasus region of the Russian Empire, and aided by some Ottoman Armenians, the Ottoman government decided to issue the Tehcir Law, which started the deportation of the ethnic Armenians, particularly from the provinces close to the Ottoman–Russian front, resulting in what became known as the Armenian genocide. Through forced marches and gang skirmishes, the Armenians living in eastern Anatolia were uprooted from their ancestral homelands and sent southwards to the Ottoman provinces in Syria and Mesopotamia. Estimates vary on how many Armenians perished, but scholars give figures ranging from 300,000 (per the modern Turkish state), 600,000 (per early estimates by Western researchers) to up to 1.5 million (per modern Western and Armenian scholars).

The Arab Revolt which began in 1916 turned the tide against the Ottomans at the Middle Eastern front, where they initially seemed to have the upper hand during the first two years of the war. When the Armistice of Mudros was signed on 30 October 1918, the only parts of the Arabian peninsula that were still under Ottoman control were Yemen, Asir, the city of Medina, portions of northern Syria and portions of northern Iraq. These territories were handed over to the British forces on 23 January 1919. The Ottomans were also forced to evacuate the parts of the former Russian Empire in the Caucasus (in present-day Georgia, Armenia and Azerbaijan), which they had gained towards the end of World War I, following Russia's retreat from the war with the Russian Revolution in 1917.

Under the terms of the Treaty of Sèvres, the partitioning of the Ottoman Empire was solidified. The new countries created from the former territories of the Ottoman Empire currently number 39.

=== Turkish War of Independence (1919–1923) ===
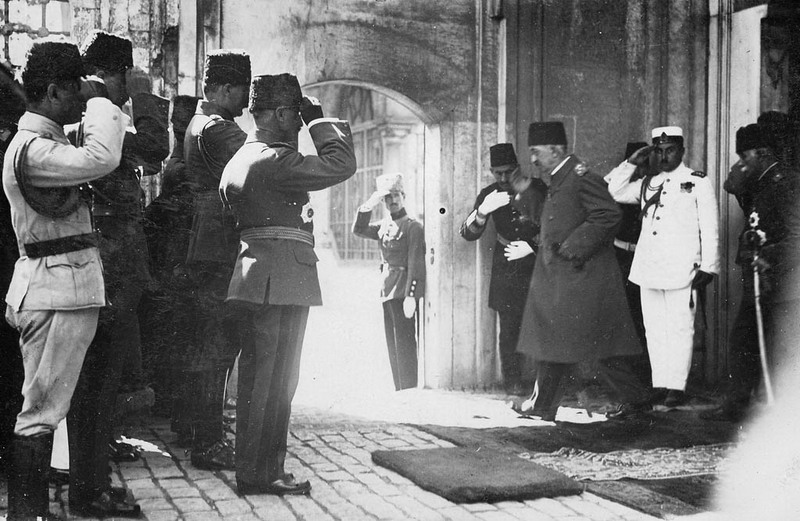
Departure of Mehmed VI, last Sultan of the Ottoman State, 1922.

The occupation of Constantinople along with the occupation of İzmir mobilized the establishment of the Turkish national movement, which won the 1919–1923 Turkish War of Independence under the leadership of Mustafa Kemal Pasha. The Sultanate was abolished on 1 November 1922, and the last sultan, Mehmed VI Vahdettin (r. 1918–1922), left the country on 17 November 1922. The new independent Grand National Assembly of Turkey (GNA) was internationally recognized with the Treaty of Lausanne on 24 July 1923. The GNA officially declared the Republic of Turkey on 29 October 1923. The Caliphate was constitutionally abolished several months later, on 3 March 1924. The Sultan and his family were declared personae non gratae of Turkey and exiled.

== Ottoman dynasty after dissolution ==
In 1974, descendants of the dynasty were granted the right to acquire Turkish citizenship by the Grand National Assembly, and were notified that they could apply. Mehmed Orhan, son of Prince Mehmed Abdul Kadir of the Ottoman Empire, died in 1994, leaving the grandson of Ottoman Sultan Abdülhamid II, Ertuğrul Osman, as the eldest surviving member of the deposed dynasty. Osman for many years refused to carry a Turkish passport, calling himself a citizen of the Ottoman Empire. Despite this attitude, he put the matter of an Ottoman restoration to rest when he told an interviewer "no" to the question of whether he wished the Ottoman Empire to be restored. He was quoted as saying that "democracy works well in Turkey." He returned to Turkey in 1992 for the first time since the exile, and became a Turkish citizen with a Turkish passport in 2002.

On 23 September 2009, Osman died at the age of 97 in Istanbul, and with his death the last of the line born under the Ottoman Empire was extinguished. In Turkey, Osman was known as "the last Ottoman".

Harun Osmanoğlu, the 3rd generation grandson of Abdul Hamid II, is the eldest living member of the former ruling dynasty.

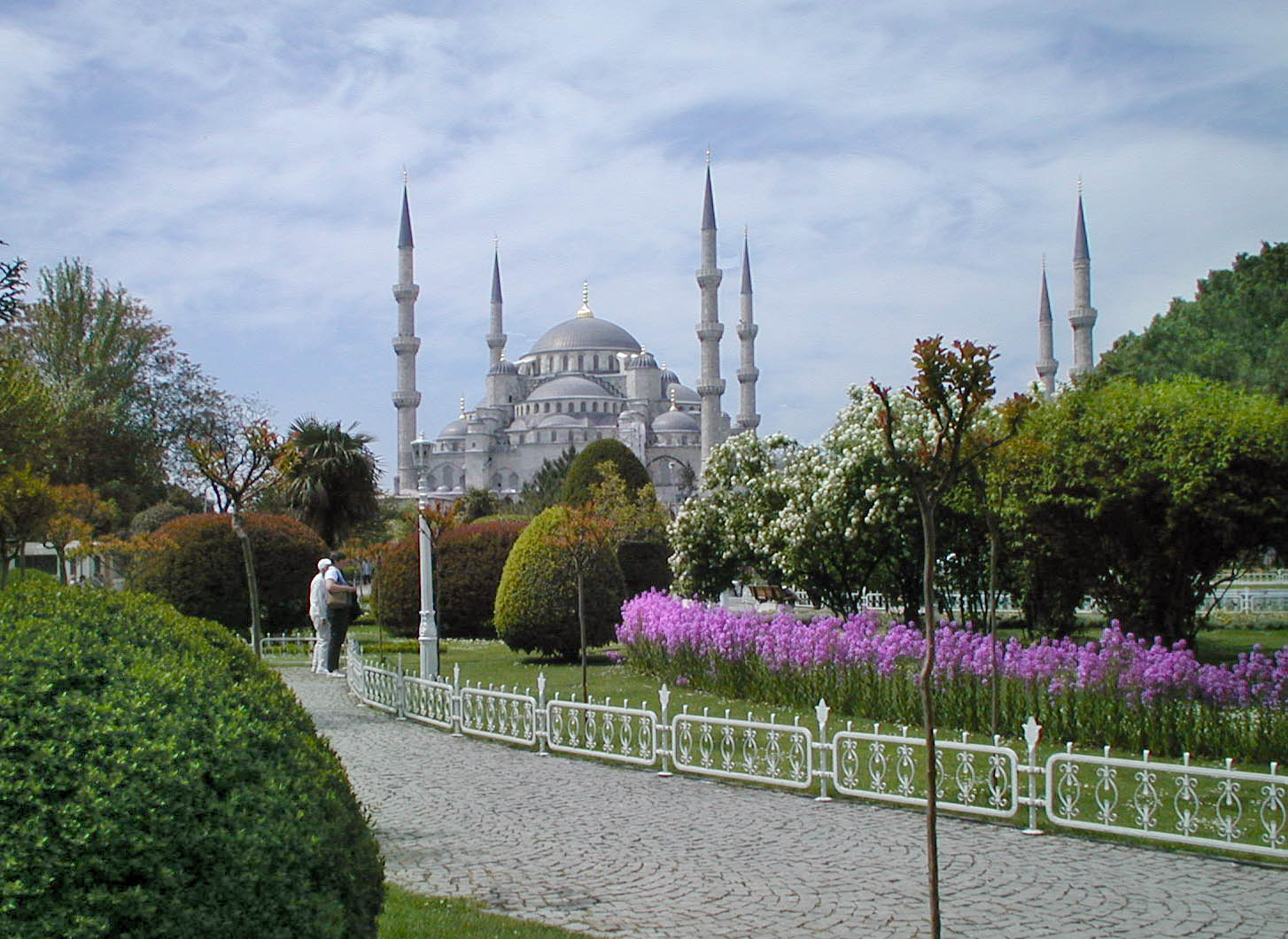
The Blue Mosque Sultan Ahmed Mosque (1616)

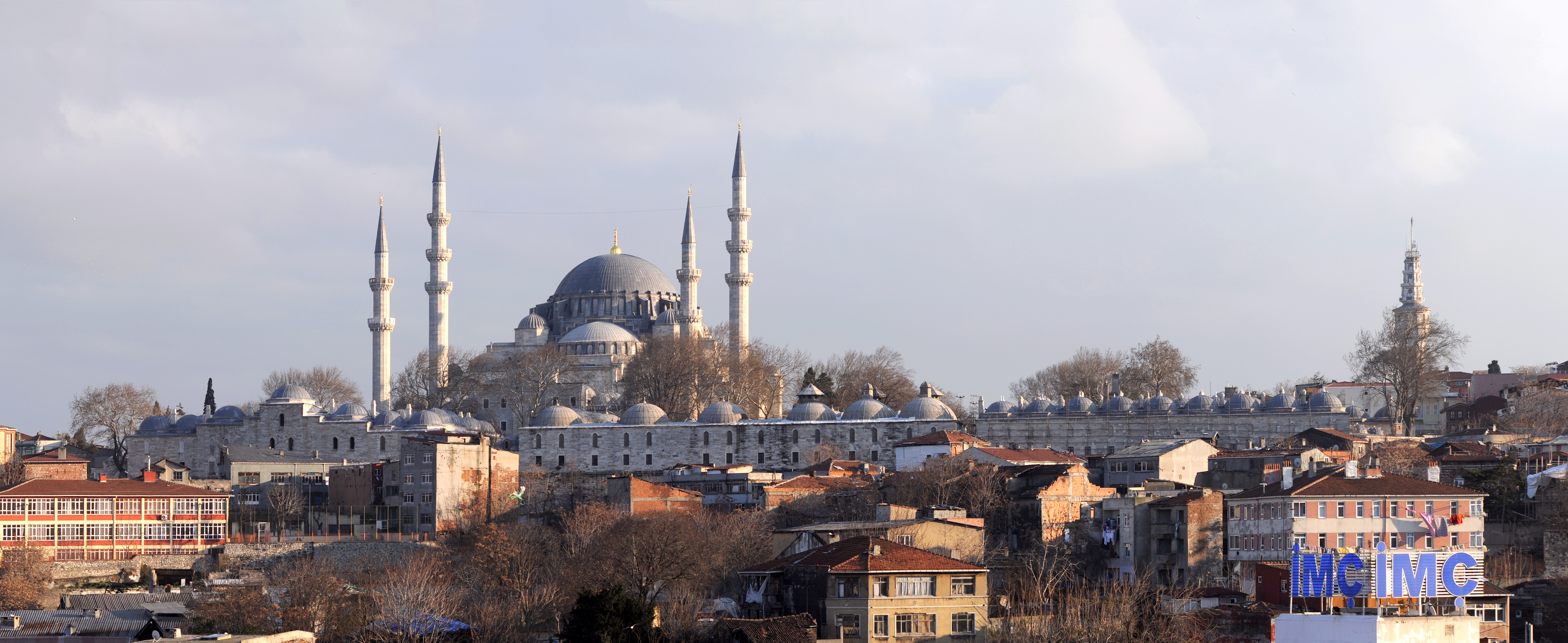
Süleymaniye Mosque (Ottoman imperial mosque-1556)

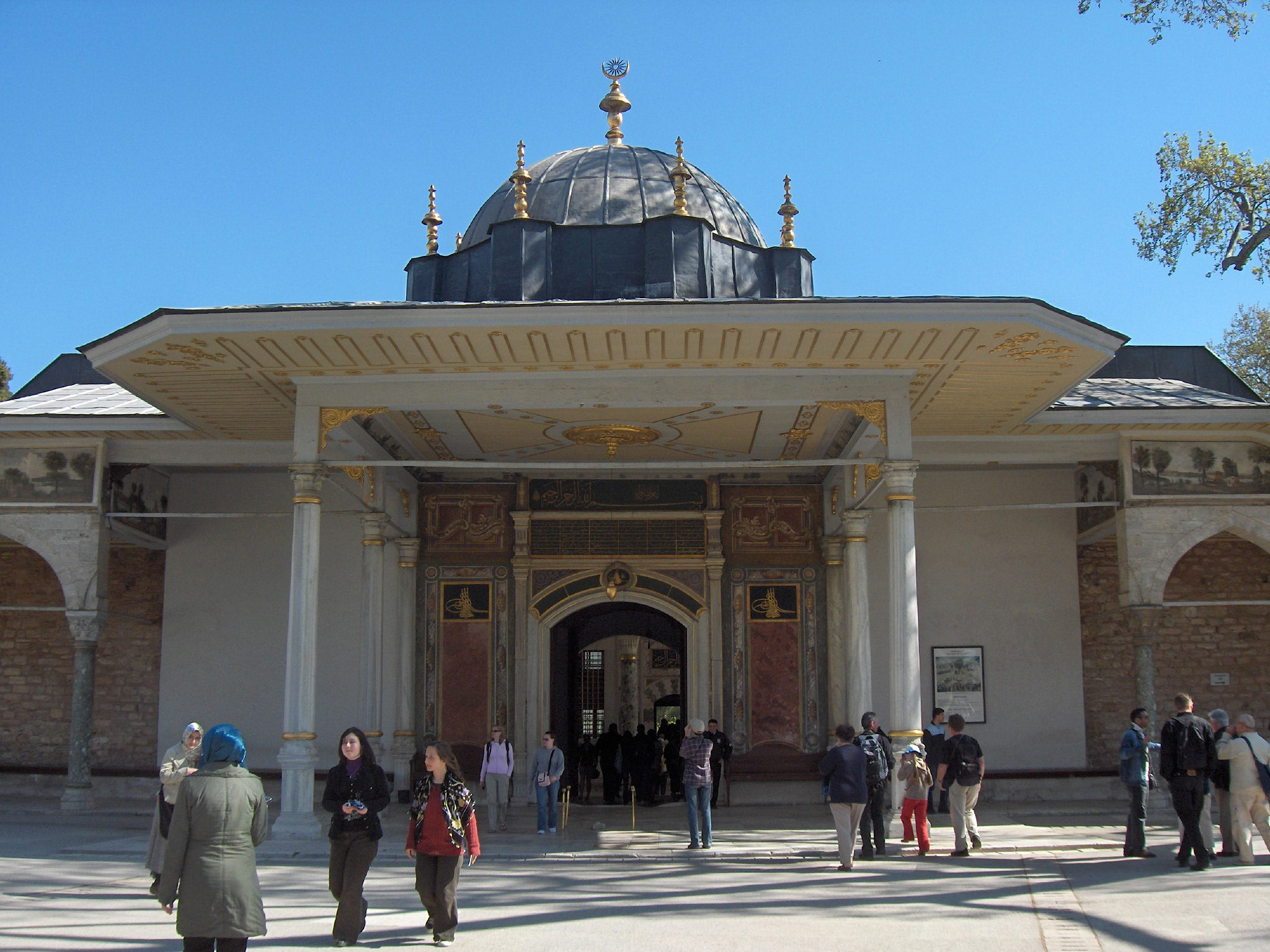
Topkapı Palace (1453)

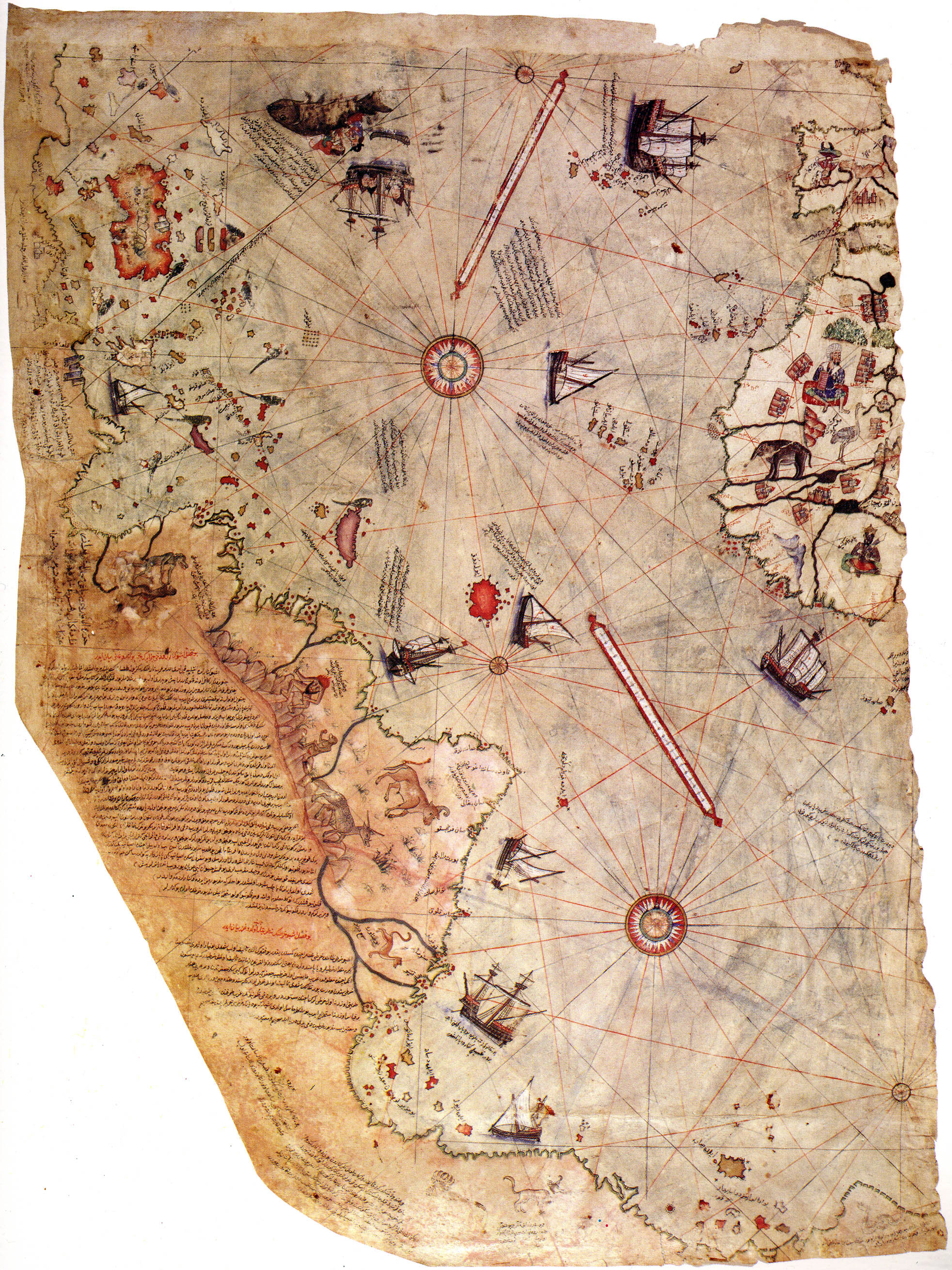
Piri Reis map (1513)

== Fall of the Empire ==
In many ways, the circumstances surrounding the Ottoman Empire's fall were a result of tensions between the Empire's different ethnic groups and the various governments' inability to deal with these tensions. The introduction of increased cultural rights, civil liberties and a parliamentary system during the Tanzimat proved too late to reverse the nationalistic and secessionist trends that had already been set in motion since the early 19th century.

== See also ==
- History of the Republic of Turkey (1923–present)
- Outline of the Ottoman Empire
- Territorial evolution of the Ottoman Empire
- Timeline of the Ottoman Empire
- Wikilala
