= Armenian national awakening =

Armenian Nation

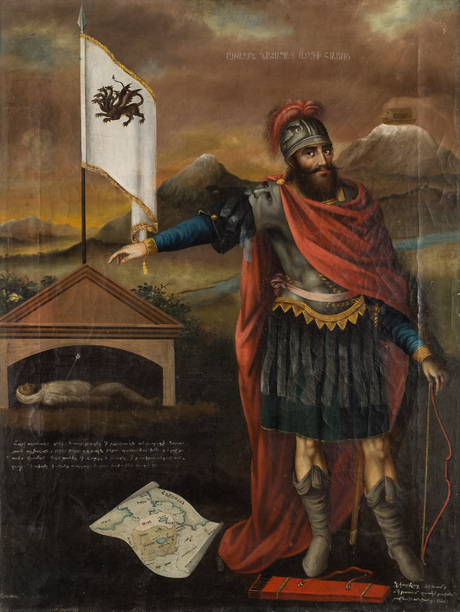
"Hayk", the legendary founder of the Armenian nation, standing next to the tomb of Bel, with Hayk's arrow still in Bel's chest. The map depicts the Lake Van region and Mount Ararat, with Noah's ark.

The Armenian national awakening was part of the broader rise of nationalism among non-Turkish ethnic groups during the late Ottoman Empire. The Ottoman Empire sought to counter Armenian nationalism during the Tanzimat era, known historically as the period of reformation, initially through the promotion of Ottomanism and later by transforming the empire into a constitutional monarchy during the First Constitutional Era. However, the reorganization of the millets—the legal courts for confessional communities—exacerbated the issue of dualism within the Ottoman state.

During the Armenian national awakening, Sultan Abdul Aziz sanctioned the promulgation of a basic law for the Gregorian Armenian Millet, protecting Armenian rights and privileges. This corresponded with the opening of an Armenian National Assembly, which took over responsibility of temporal matters from the Armenian Patriarchate. Armenian Ottomans operated their own courts of law; collected their own taxes; and maintained their own prisons, hospitals, and schools. As a result, some observers noted that the Armenian community functioned in many ways like a state within a state.

Over the course of Ottoman Armenia, some Armenians began to advocate for republicanism rather than allegiance to the Ottoman Dynasty, with some being interested in becoming an autonomous region. During the Second Constitutional Era, parties like the Social Democrat Hunchakian Party (Hunchaks), Armenian Democratic Liberal Party (Ramgavar Party or Armenakan), and Armenian Revolutionary Federation (Dashnaks) were the main representatives of Armenian interests in the Ottoman government, and sometimes also used militancy to defend their constituents. After World War I and the Armenian genocide, the First Armenian Republic declared independence from the Ottoman and Russian Empires.

== Origins ==
=== Prehistoric-Historic Era ===
The discovery of Urartu played a significant role in 19th- and 20th-century Armenian nationalism. Armenian nationalism included a range of interpretations of Prehistoric Armenia, including the link to the Iron Age kingdom of Urartu, as some scientists claimed the Urartu state was an Armenian state. Identifying with the Urartu state and its prehistoric forerunners came to be a powerful symbol of Armenian culture, especially among the diaspora.

=== Armenian Classic Era ===
In the Ottoman Empire, the social structure of Armenians before the 18th century was based on the millet system.

The Armenian millet was a confessional community in the Ottoman Empire. The millet specifically referred to the separate legal courts pertaining to personal law under which sections of the society were allowed to rule themselves with fairly little interference from the central system. Each millet was under the supervision of an Ethnarch ("national" leader), most often a religious leader. The Armenian millet was under the Armenian Apostolic Church. The millets could set their own laws and collect their own taxes. As People of The Book, Armenians were able to maintain their houses of worship, obtain religious literature, and employ clergy of their faith for their congregations. These rights became limited with the economic and technological developments of the 18th century.

Around this time, instances of Armenian desires for self-determination emerged, such as Davit Bek's resistance to Ottoman and Safavid domination during the Syunik rebellion.

=== Armenian Renaissance ===
Armenian Renaissance

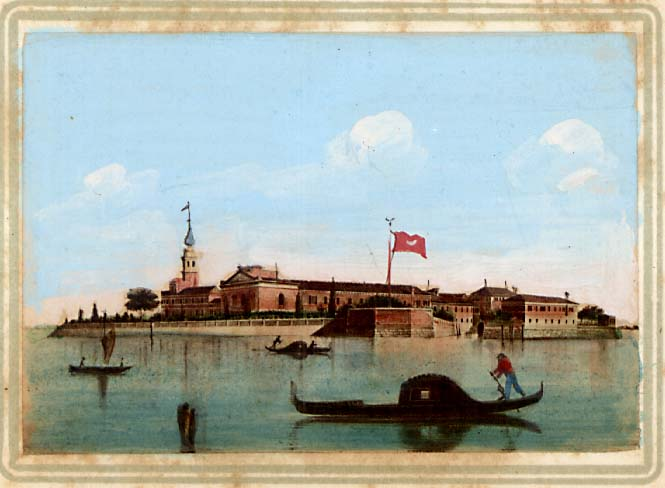
Mekhitarist Order in the island of San Lazzaro

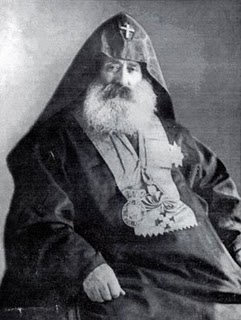
Mkrtich Khrimian

Early national sentiments arose from Armenian monks belonging to the Mekhitarist Order and the sociopolitical movements, including the French Revolution and the Russian nihilist movement.

The 18th century generated new schools and libraries and a chance to study in the universities of Western Europe for well-connected Christians of the Ottoman Empire.

In addition, Protestant missionaries soon became involved in evangelizing among the Apostolic Armenians. From the first day when Rev. William Goodell settled in Constantinople in 1831 to the end of World War I, missionaries made considerable contributions to the education of Armenians. They not only stressed elementary education, but also established colleges and other institutions of learning. The notable institutions included Central College of Antep, Euphrates College of Harpout, Anatolia College at Marsovan, Central Girls' College at Marash, and St. Paul's Institute at Tarsus. There were also colleges, such as International College at Smyrna, American College for Girls, Syrian Protestant College at Beirut, and Robert College, in which institutions many Armenian students received their education. Here, they came into contact with the radical ideas of the Age of Enlightenment and the French Revolution.

Educated and influential members of the large diaspora tried to transmit these ideas back to their own communities, with the aim of raising their educational level while simultaneously strengthening their national identity. The European intellectual currents, such as ideas of French Revolution, were transmitted through the 23,000 Armenian students within 127 Protestant congregations, with 13,000 communicants, and 400 schools.

The Mekhitarist Order had exclusive devotion to all persons and things Armenian. Mekhitar was born at Sebastia in 1676. He entered a monastery, but was concerned about the level of culture and education in Armenia at that period and sought to do something about it. Contacts with Western missionaries led him to become interested in translating material from the West into Armenian and setting up an order to facilitate education. Amongst their countrymen, the influence of the Mekhitarist Order not only connected Armenians closer to God, but also facilitated an early sense of national ambition.

Father Ghevont Alishan was a member of the Mkhitarist Congregation in Venice. In 1885, the Armenian Patriotic Society of Europe appealed to him to create the first modern Armenian flag. Alishan designed a flag inspired by the national Flag of France, identified today as the "Nationalist Armenian Flag." Its colors were red, green, and blue, representing the band of colors that Noah saw after landing on Mount Ararat.

In 1863, Ottoman Armenians were introduced to major reforms as an extension of Tanzimat. Attempting to stem the tide of nationalist movements within the Ottoman Empire, the Tanzimât period emerged from the minds of reformist sultans like Mahmud II and Abdul Majid, as well as prominent reformers who were European-educated bureaucrats. The Armenian National Constitution (150 articles drafted by Nahabet Rusinian, Servichen, Nigoghos Balian, Krikor Odian, and Krikor Margosian) defined the condition of Armenians in the Ottoman Empire, but also introduced regulations defining the authority of the Patriarch. The "Armenian Constitution" and Armenian National Assembly were seen as a milestone by progressive Armenians. Khrimian Hayrik worked to increase the influence of sub-councils of the Armenian National Assembly. The Armenian National Assembly had a general assembly in Constantinople and sub-councils in the provincial centers. The general assembly consisted of 120 Armenian Nobles and 20 ecclesiastical members. The assembly in the capital seldom met.

Local assemblies were often deaf to the complaints of the poorer members of the community. In 1880, the wealthy and influential Armenians signed an address of loyalty and devotion to the Sultan, condemning nationalist agitation as the work of misguided persons who have no authority or influence. This alienation from the center was highlighted by the work of bishop Mkrtich Khrimian. He worked to increase the influence of sub-councils of the towns of eastern Anatolia in the capital. The Armenian National Assembly's policies aligned with Anatolia with the increased influence of sub-councils. In 1892, Khrimyan was unanimously elected Catholicos of All Armenians. These two Ottoman reforms, which were theoretically examples of social change by law, brought serious stress over Ottoman political and administrative structure. Armenian Nobles (Amira) were not happy, and they were the owners of the economic system.

== National Revival ==
Perspectives of National Revival

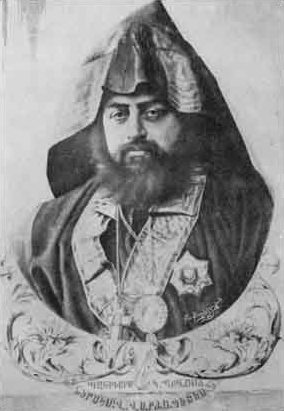
Civilization: "It is no longer possible for the Armenians and the Turks to live together... (Nerses Varjabedian)"

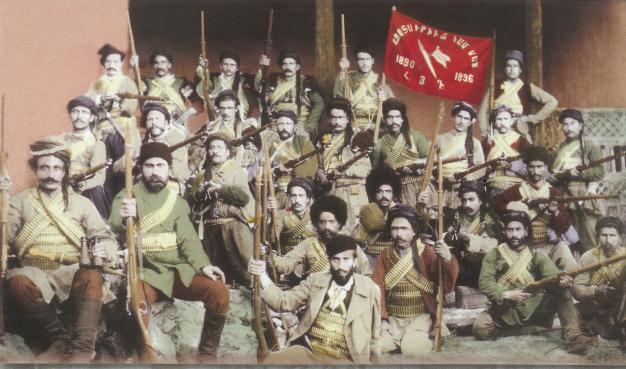
Revolution: Fedayees

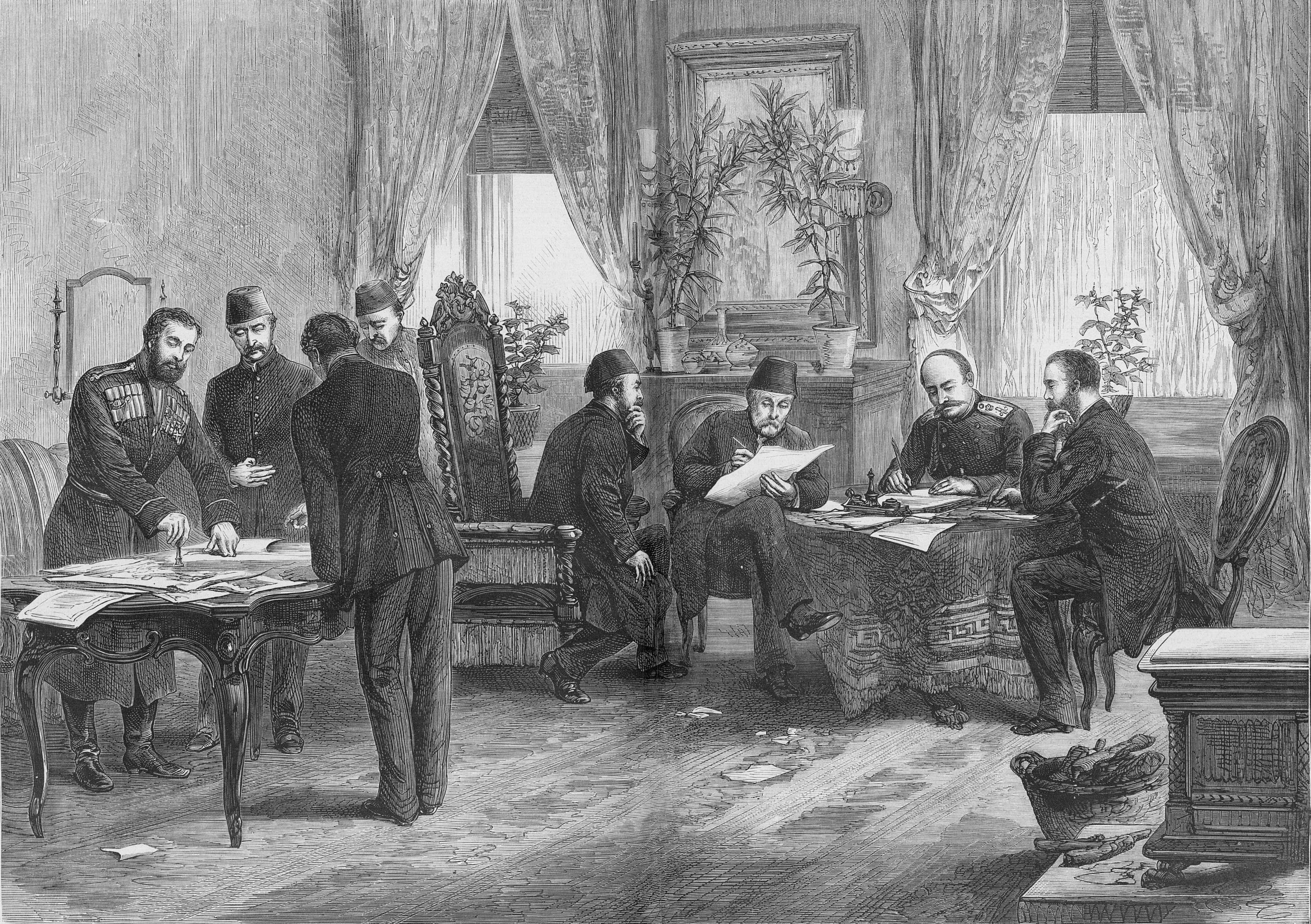
Armenian Question: Negotiations for San Stefano Agreement

The Armenian national ideology developed long after the Greek movement, however, the factors contributing to the emergence of Armenian nationalism made the movement far more similar to that of the Greeks than those of other ethnic groups. Unresolved social issues in the Empire began to feed Armenian national politics, along the other ethnic groups. As the Millet system degraded, Armenians began to rethink their position in the world. The Armenian subjects of the Empire were influenced by the Armenian Diaspora and the network of congregations and schools of the Protestant missionaries throughout the Empire. After the 1877-1878 Russo-Turkish War, the Russian-Ottoman border region brought on new political and military structure. Many Circassian and Laz muhacir from the Russian Empire were forcefully deported to Ottoman Empire. These emigrations brought tensions and changed the population distribution, as well as the balance of power within the local communities in eastern Anatolia.

Russia proclaimed itself protector of Christian Armenians, and this created a relatively more hostile environment to the Muslims, mostly Kurdish, who were left under Russian control. Kurdish-Armenian relations came to another turn. The newly established relations were complex. The change did not only affected the Armenian Millet, but also the local non-tribal Kurds as well. The Kurdish tribal leaders that fled during the war began to express their power along the countryside. The region's social structure and coexistence of the communities was broken. The broken social structure required implementation of new reforms.

Kagik Ozanyan claims that the Tanzimat spurred the formation of an Armenian political strata and incited the Armenian national spirit, which was aligned with the nation building through revolution. General Mayewski, who was the Russian Consul General to Ottoman Empire, recorded the following:

The rebellion of Armenians resulted from the following three causes:
(1). Their known evolution in political matters (Issue of Civilizations),
(2). Development of ideas of nationalism, salvation and independence in Armenian opinion (Revolution Perspective),
(3). Supporting of these ideas by Western governments and publication through the inspiration and efforts of Armenian clerical men (Humanitarian intervention).

— Russian General Counsel Mayewski

=== Civilization Perspective ===
According to one essentialist position, the breakdown of the "coexistence of the communities within the Ottoman Empire" was the direct result of the Christian Armenians and Muslims Turks and Kurds not being able to live together. Armenian Patriarch Nerses Varjabedyan expresses his position to British Minister of Foreign Affairs, Lord Salisbury on April 13, 1878.

It is no longer possible for the Armenians and the Turks to live together. Only a Christian administration can provide the equality, justice and the freedom of conscience. A Christian administration should replace the Muslim administration. Armenia (Eastern Anatolia) and Kilikya, are the regions, where the Christian administration should be founded... The Turkish Armenians want this... That is, a Christian administration is demanded in Turkish Armenia, as in Lebanon.

— Patriarch Nerses Varjabedyan

Most of the Ottoman sources do not give credit to these claims. They present the argument that the system of "millet" and state and religion preserved the Empire for centuries. A strong argument behind rejecting the "clash of civilizations" originated from the analysis of the activity timetable. The clashes collected in distinct events. Each event had high density with distinct beginning and an end. There was no single period that a thousand deaths were spread over a long period of time. This fact supports the "revolutionary view" instead of clash of civilizations, which showed the European powers the true nature of Ottoman rule. European powers needed to do something about these events through the international agreements. Assuredly, Europe would do nothing if those thousand deaths were spread over years.

=== Armenian Question Perspective ===
The Greeks were thus the first of the Ottoman Empire's subjects to secure recognition as an independent sovereign power. After a long and bloody struggle, and with the aid of the Great Powers, the Greek Revolution won independence for Greece from the Ottoman Empire granted by the Treaty of Constantinople in July 1832. The national awakening of Bulgaria and, consequently the liberation of Bulgaria, originate after the events of the Russo-Turkish War of 1877–78, which led to the re-establishment of a Bulgarian Sovereign state with the Treaty of San Stefano. There had been no considerable movement in behalf of Armenian independence before Abdul Hamid II's reign. 1878 marked the first down turn of relations between Armenians and the Ottoman Empire.

The stipulation in favor of Armenian autonomy in the Treaty of Berlin produced an immediate change. Unfortunately, there were special difficulties for the realization of the so-called Ottoman liberal political program. For one thing, not all the Armenians were under the Ottoman Empire. There were Armenians in the Russian Empire approaching 900,000 at the 19th century. Ottoman subjects amounted to perhaps 1,200,000, and were mainly distributed through the six vilayets of Sivas, Bitlis, Erzerum, Harput, Diyarbekir, and Van. In some of these districts, they formed pluralities. Besides other difficulties, Armenians perceived the stipulations of the treaty (Article LXI) of Berlin as an early realization of their autonomy. In 1879, one year after the agreements, the only thing missing was the practical events to enable the articles for the demand of an Armenian state.

After the Armenian Massacres of 1894-1896, the Armenian population in the six vilayets, which overlapped with some Kurdish regions, declined between 80,000 and 300,000. These massacres were perpetuated by the Hamidiye regiments, and the European powers were asked to intervene. Instead of Armenian autonomy in these regions, Kurds (Kurdish tribal chiefs) retained much of their autonomy and power. Abdulhamid made little attempt to alter the traditional power structure of "segmented, agrarian Kurish societies". The Sultan trusted the Kurds in safeguarding the southern and eastern fringe of the empire and mountainous topography, and limited transportation and communication system. The state had little access to these provinces and were forced to make informal agreements with tribal chiefs. For instance, the Ottoman qadi and mufti did not have jurisdiction over religious law, which bolstered Kurdish authority and autonomy. The Armenian national movement had discovered through their revolutionary movement that neither Tsar Alexander II with his idealism nor Gladstone's Liberalism were dependable allies.

The first effective intervention had come from Woodrow Wilson, who agreed to transfer what would be named "Wilsonian Armenia" back to the Armenians in the Treaty of Sèvres.

=== Revolution Perspective ===
Ottoman Armenians educated with the European Way began to make attempts in forming organizations—secret societies and local groups such as the Protectors of the Fatherland (1881) which was established in Erzurum. Protectors of the Fatherland was almost certainly affected by the ideas of the French Revolution and Greek Revolution, as "Freedom or Death" was their motto.

The Armenian national liberation movement gathered momentum with the establishment of the Armenian Revolutionary Federation, Social Democrat Hunchakian Party, and Armenakan (later named as Ramgavar). The Social Democrat Hunchakian Party (Hentchaks) had the goal to gain Armenia's independence from the Ottoman Empire. The Armenian Revolutionary Federation (ARF) originally aimed for autonomy of the Armenian-populated areas, which changed to the establishment of an Armenian state with the coming years. The ARF adopted a decentralized modus operandi, according to which the various chapters in different countries were allowed to plan and implement policies in tune with their local political atmosphere.

From 1880 to 1890, the local communication channels were developed. The organizations were fully functional in Ankara, Amasya, Çorum, Diyarbakır, Yozgat, and Tokat. In 1893, they began to publish propaganda toward the non-Armenian subjects. The main theme of these materials were that people should take control of their own life against the oppressors. The propaganda did not have any effect on the Muslims. These activities ended with clashes between the Armenian revolutionaries and Ottoman police. Most revolutionaries received jail time. The Ottoman Empire and Britain would then negotiate the release of the activists. Some British observers concluded that Armenian revolutionaries were the responsible party. Local authorities took initiative against the revolutionaries, as they were cutting telegraph wires and bombing government buildings. Britain or European powers concluded that further intervention would end with sectarian conflict.

Armenians mainly lived in the intersection of three empires: the Ottoman Empire, Russian Empire, and Persian Empire. The Armenian diaspora, which lived in mainly Europe, was composed of the elite, who were being educated in European universities or performing the trade. The Armenians in Europe began to hold meetings about their oppressed status, leading to the foundation of parties that would formalize "national politics" under Armenakans, Hnchakians, and Dashnaks with the coming years. These secret societies (or parties for some) which developed "National Policies", stated goals such as "freeing the Armenians from the Ottoman Empire by any means possible". H. K. Vartanian wrote that the Armenian revolutionary movement was a direct and necessary response to the increasingly intolerable social, economic, and political conditions of the decaying and declining Ottoman Empire in the 19th century.

The Armenian national movement was an international movement. However, the practical center of gravity for Armenian revolutionaries was within the Armenians in the Russian Empire, where Armenians could meet, organize funds, and send materials to their comrades in the Ottoman Empire easily. The organization that was founded in Geneva (Europe), mostly by active Russian Armenians, took the idea of nationalism and gave it a clear imprint of Caucasian revolutionary thought in 1887. Caucasian revolutionary thought was directed at the Ottoman Empire, which the diaspora saw as its homeland. The Young Armenia Society was founded in 1889 by Kristapor Mikayelian, and organized Fedayee campaigns into Ottoman territory. The Tsarist regime cracked down on any attempt by Russian Armenians to engage in action across the border, a leading example being the Gugunian Expedition of 1890.

The Bashkaleh Resistance was the first recorded bloody encounter between the Armenians and the Ottoman Empire, in May 1889.
