= Nahapet Rusinian =

Ottoman Armenian poet, publicist, physician, orator, writer, activist and translator

Nahabed Rusinian
- Nahabed Rusinian
- Born: 1819 village of Efkere, near Kayseri
- Died: 1876 (aged 56–57)
- Occupations: poet, publicist, physician, orator, writer, political activist, translator

Nahabed Rusinian (Armenian: Նահապետ Ռուսինեան, Turkish: Nahabet Rusinyan; 1819–1876) was an Ottoman Armenian poet, publicist, physician, orator, writer, political activist, translator, and contributor to the Armenian National Constitution.

== Life ==
Nahabed Rusinian was born in the village of Efkere near Kayseri in 1819 to Armenian parents. His family moved to Constantinople in 1828. He completed his secondary education in Constantinople and in 1840, he was awarded a scholarship to continue his studies in medicine in Paris. While in Paris, Rusinian audited courses on literature and philosophy at the Sorbonne, and was influenced by the ideas of Lamartine, Jean-Jacques Rousseau, Montesquieu, Victor Hugo, and other political philosophers. It was at the Sorbonne where Rusinian was confronted, for the very first time, with the principle of popular vote and other constitutionalist ideas. Rusinian returned to Constantinople in 1851 and upon recommendation of Servitchen, he became the family physician of Fuad Pasha. He died in 1879 in Istanbul.

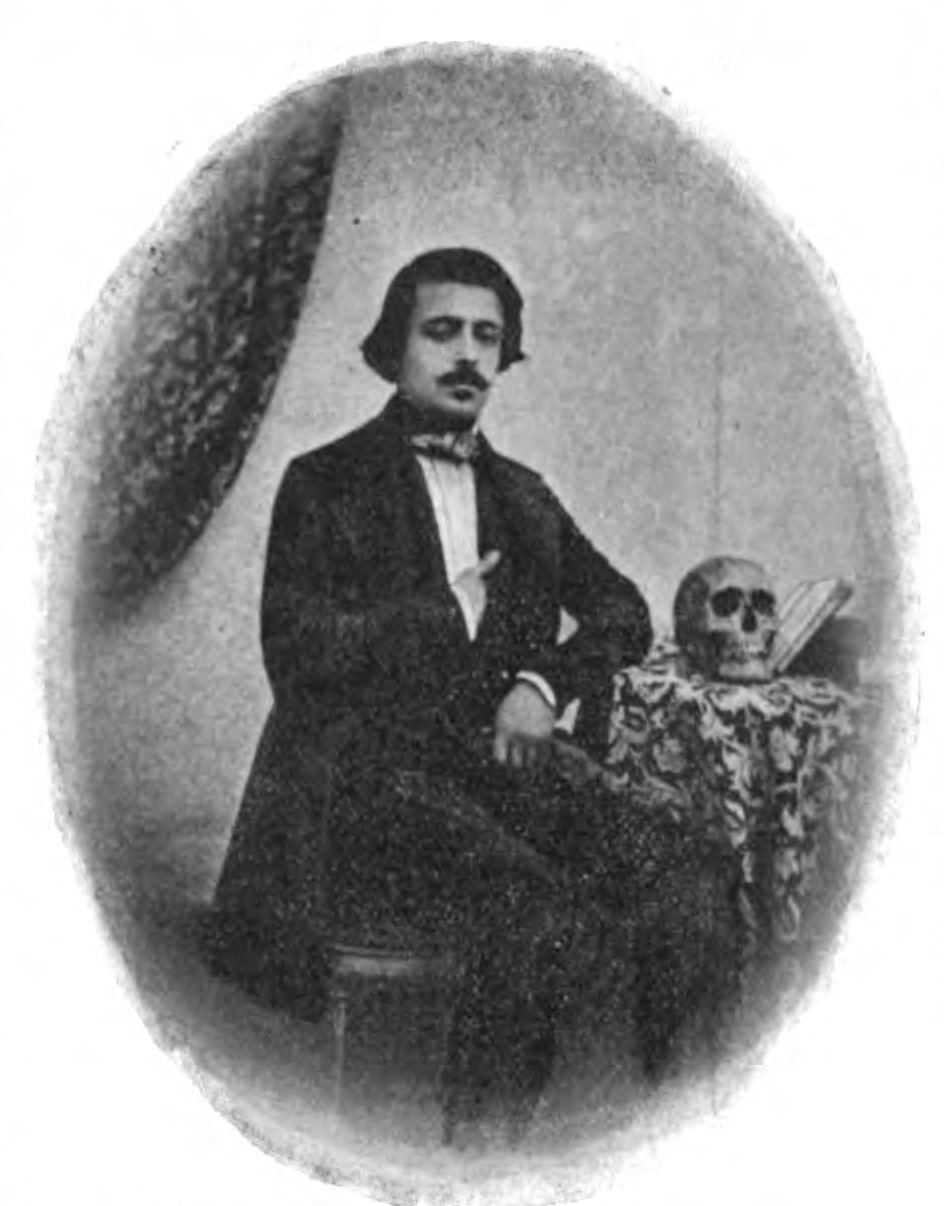
Nahabed Rusinian Student Portrait

== Political activism ==
His first attempts at political reform, within the Armenian millet, were concentrated on language and education. His Ughghakhosutiun (Orthoepy), with all its shortcomings, was the result of a creative mind, and possessed the value of a pioneering effort. In 1858 he was appointed by the Ottoman government an official physician for the Military Hospital of Istanbul where he served until 1860. In the millet's national assemblies, Rusinian was considered the most liberal deputy, constantly conceiving new projects for reform. After the establishment of the Armenian National Constitution and during the National Assembly sessions, Rusinian switched alternatively between speaker of the assembly and deputy.

== Literary activity ==
Nahabed Rusinian translated numerous literary works from French authors such as Victor Hugo's Ruy Blas. His poem "Giligia", an adaptation of Frédéric Bérat's French poem "Ma Normandie", contains nationalist and emotional themes. It became the lyrics of the famous song of the same name.
