= Amira (Ottoman Empire) =

In the Ottoman Empire, amira was a small group of elite, wealthy Ottoman Armenians living in urban centers of Western Armenia, and in Istanbul. This word has an Arab origin, meaning "prince" or "lord", but to the Armenians had the restricted meaning of "national leader." The term was used between 1550 and 1870.

== Role in the Ottoman State ==
The amira class played a role in Ottoman finances and administration due to their wealth and connections. Many amiras were sarrafs (money changers) or technocrats, helping to sustain the Ottoman financial structure until European capitalist penetration in the 1850s. They enjoyed certain privileges, but their position rested on favor, not rights: amiras could be fined, dismissed, or executed and their wealth confiscated at a stroke by the Sublime Porte. Within the Ottoman Empire, Armenians were considered second-class citizens; they were required to pay extra taxes and faced discriminatory laws.

== Role in the Armenian Millet ==
Up until the mid 19th century, the amira class exerted significant control over the Armenian millet in the Ottoman Empire, particularly by bringing the Armenian Patriarchate of Istanbul under their influence. The amiras were also instrumental in the cultural preservation and revival of the Armenian people. Through their financial and moral support, many secular schools were established in Istanbul, and numerous books and periodicals were published. Their philanthropic efforts were notable, extending to the construction and repair of churches. However, In the struggle for a Constitution to regulate the affairs of the millet, the amiras, largely opposed the constitutionalists. However, the Ottoman Tanzimat reform movement supported the constitutionalists, leading the amiras to eventually accept the institution of a constitution in 1860.

== Decline ==
The decline of the Amira class as a distinct power elite occurred following the rise of liberalism in Turkey. After the Crimean War (1856) the Ottoman treasury turned to European lenders, stripping Armenian sarraf-bankers of their influence on state finance and undercutting the amiras’ wealth. The decline in the financial power of the amiras' was followed by a decline in their political privileges due to the rise of the Armenian National Constitution in 1860. The Tanzimat reforms and the influx of Western capital reduced the role of the millet system, with civic reforms opening bureaucratic and communal positions to a wider spectrum of Armenians. This led to both new communal councils and a decline in amira representation on the Civil Council fell from nine members (1847) to two members (1855). Finally, the title of "bey", "aga", or "çelebi" which was official Ottoman nomenclature came to replace the honorific of amira. By the 1870s the amiras had assimilated into the wider Armenian upper middle class.
