= Confessional community =

Group with similar religious beliefs

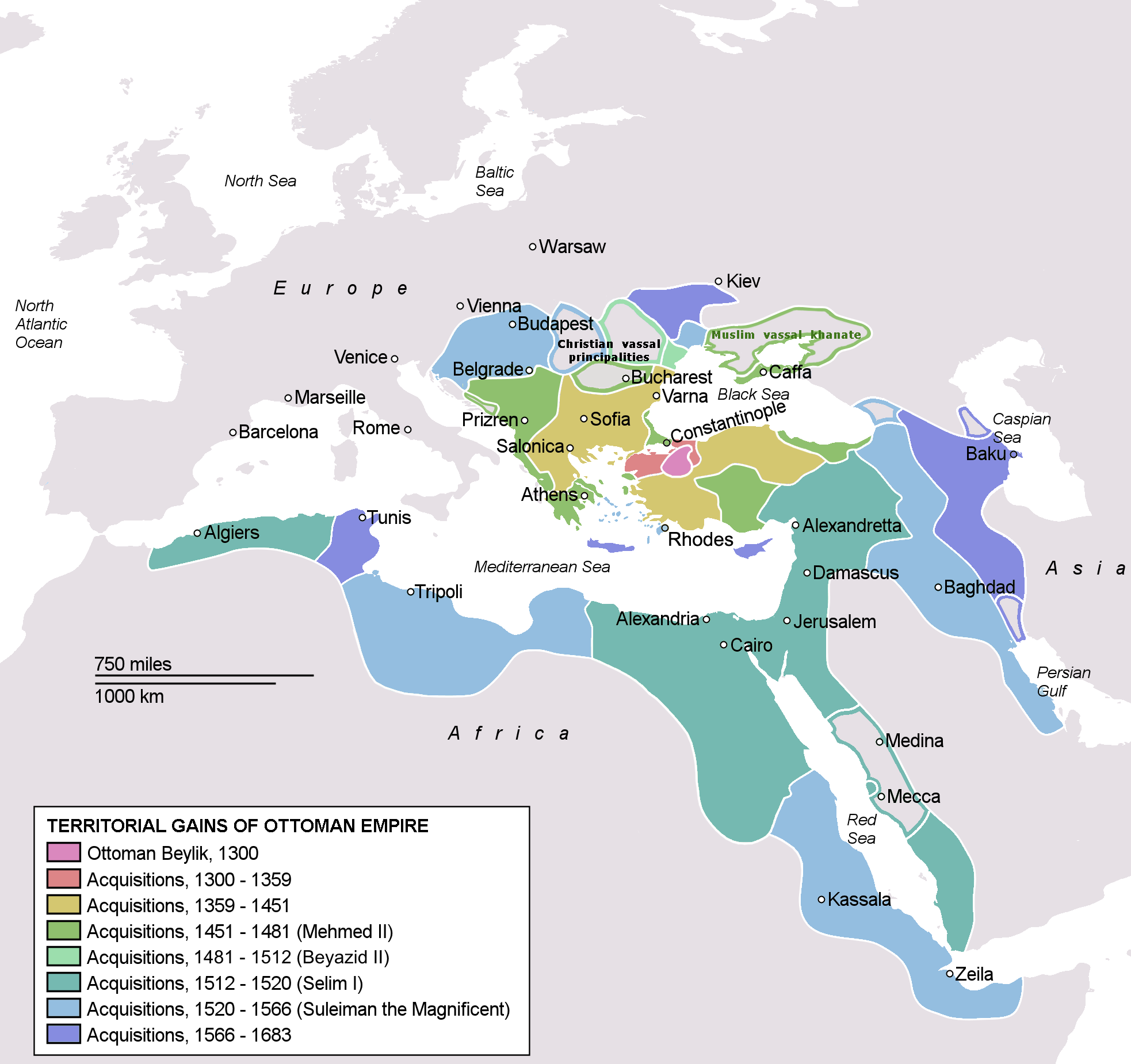
The Ottoman Empire at its greatest extent in 1683, where the millet system organized non-Muslim populations into legally recognized confessional communities.

A confessional community is a group of people organized around shared religious identity, especially where that identity has social, legal, or political significance. The term commonly overlaps with sect and millet, but a confessional community specifically refers to an institutionally-recognized religious identity.

The concept was inspired by the religious conflicts of Reformation Europe, and describes political systems in which religious confession carries legal significance, notably the Ottoman millet system and the constitution of modern Lebanon.

== Terminology ==
The idea of a confessional community is closely associated with the historical theory of confessionalization. Confessionalization describes the process by which Catholic, Lutheran, and Reformed churches established distinct doctrinal identities following the Reformation, an important development of early modern European states. The period in which this process was most pronounced (c. 1555–1620) is referred to by historians as the Confessional Age.

An important distinction in modern scholarship is between confessionalization as a historical theory and confessionalism in a political context, in which membership of a religious community carries ongoing legal or political significance.

== Reformation Europe ==
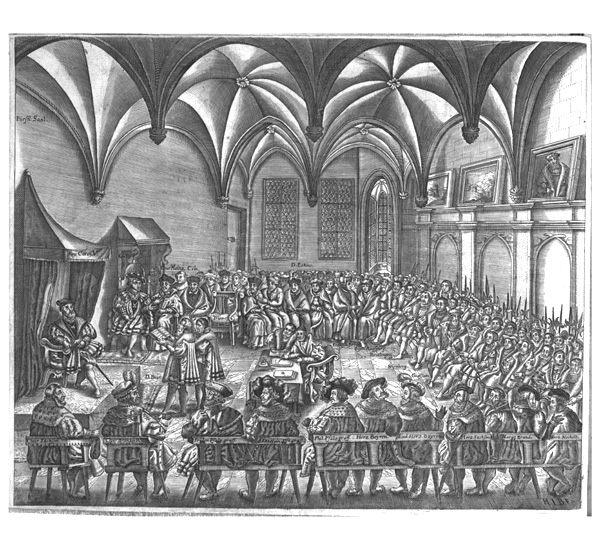
Negotiating the Religious Peace of Augsburg (1555), which established the principle of cuius regio, eius religio within the Holy Roman Empire.

In Europe, the institutionalization of confessional communities has its origins in the religious conflicts following the Protestant Reformation. The Peace of Augsburg (1555) codified the principle of cuius regio, eius religio ("whose realm, his religion") within the Holy Roman Empire, where the sovereign of each state determined its official religious categorization, and subjects who disagreed were allowed to emigrate. The treaty established a system where religious and political identity was tied to territory and governorship, making one's confession a matter of legal and political consequence.

The Peace of Westphalia (1648) extended formal recognition to the Reformed (Calvinist) church and introduced new protections for religious minorities within states whose ruler held a different confession. After the treaty of Westphalia, confessional communities were still legally recognized within a state regardless of its ruler's confession.

== Ottoman Empire ==
In the Ottoman Empire, non-Muslim populations were organized into legally recognized confessional communities known as millets. Each millet was granted autonomy over matters of personal law including marriage, inheritance, and education, and had its own religious administration, while remaining subject to the Ottoman state. Early recognized communities included the Greek, Armenian, and Jewish millets, and the system expanded substantially to additional groups over time.

The millet system grouped Ottoman subjects specifically by religious confession rather than ethnicity or territory. Each millet was headed by a senior religious figure, such as the Greek Patriarch or Chief Rabbi (Hakham Bashi), who served as intermediary between the community and the Ottoman state—holding responsibility for tax collection, administration of personal law, and representation before the state.

During the Tanzimat reforms (1839–1876), the millet system was substantially reorganized. The reforms bestowed millet status to previously unrecognized Christian communities such as Catholics and Protestants. The reforms also allowed for constitutions that ceded authority away from religious leadership and toward elected councils, such as the Armenian National Assembly.

== Lebanon ==
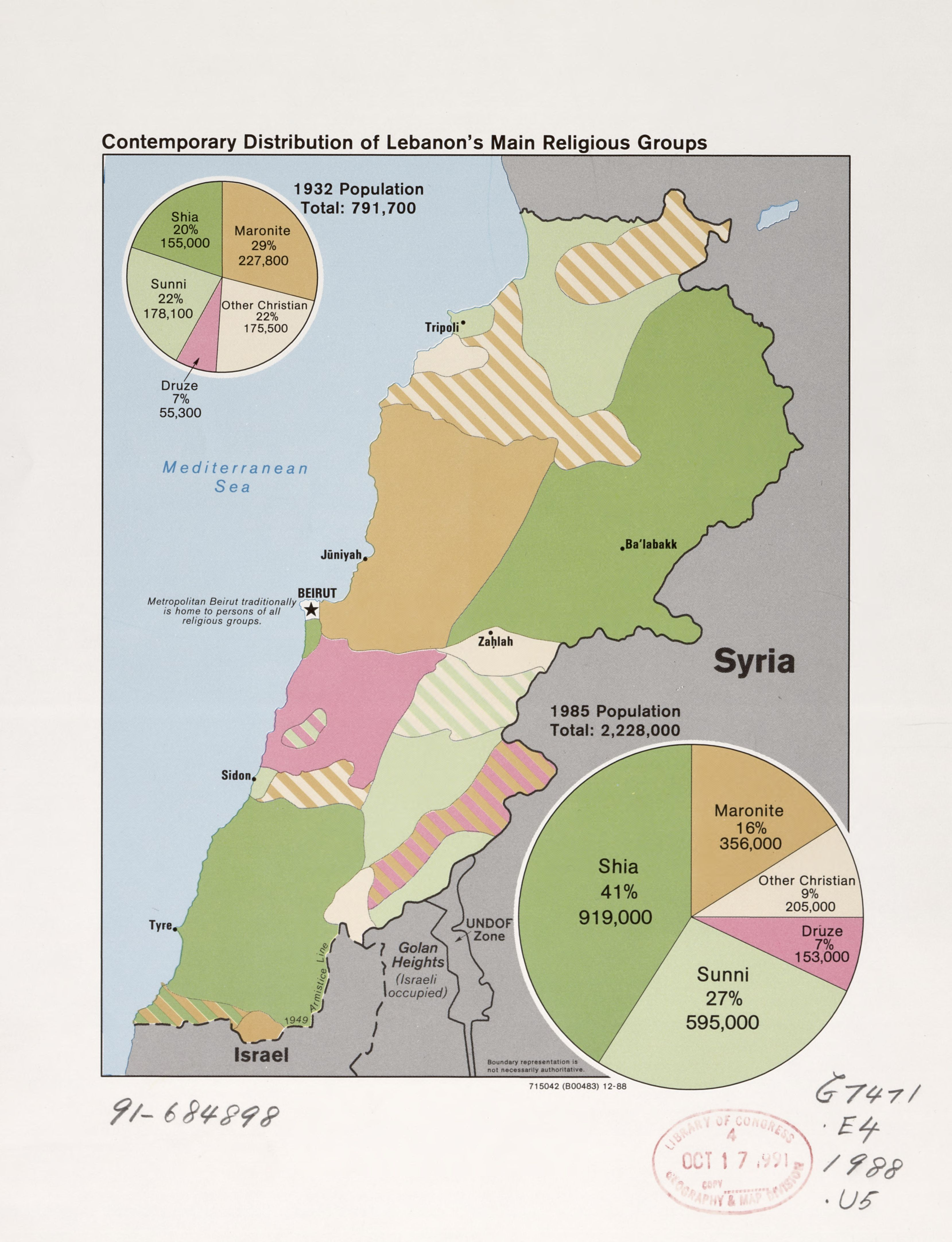
Distribution of Lebanon's main religious groups, showing the geographical basis of the country's political system.

In modern Lebanon, the National Pact of 1943 allocated each principal ruling position on confessional lines: the presidency to a Maronite Christian, prime ministership to a Sunni Muslim, and speakership of parliament to a Shia Muslim. Each share in government is proportioned according to the 1932 national census, which notably recorded a Christian majority. The demographic share recorded in 1932 has not been updated by any subsequent census.

Lebanon is often referenced in modern scholarship as an example of consociational democracy, a system in which divided societies are stabilized by a rule of several authorities rather than a national majority rule. Unlike the Ottoman millet system, where confessional communities governed their own affairs, Lebanon's system personalizes confessional identity in the structure of the government itself. In effect, religious membership represents the foundational basis for representation of each person under the law.

The Taif Agreement (1989) after the conclusion of the Lebanese Civil War amended the constitution. The agreement equalized legislative representation between Christians and Muslims, and transferred executive powers from the president to the cabinet, but retained the religious allocation of the head positions.

== Sectarianism ==
The institutionalization of confessional communities in political systems is closely associated with the emergence of sectarianism. Modern scholarship takes three main approaches to characterizing sectarianism:

- Primordialism argues that sectarianism is the expression of ancient, fixed religious divisions.
- Instrumentalism sees sectarianism as a tool through which political elites consolidate power by leveraging religious identity. This is a common criticism of Lebanon's national pact.
- Constructivism argues that sectarianism is constructed by historical conditions such as colonialism, large-scale reform, and the legalization of religious identity, rather than being innate to divided societies.

Ussama Makdisi argues that the millet system, in recognizing confessional communities as distinct legal groups, established the religious divisions that led to sectarianism in post-Ottoman states like Lebanon.

== See also ==
- Bruderhof Communities
- Millet (Ottoman Empire)
- Vakif
- National Pact
- Confessionalism
