= Millet (Ottoman Empire) =

Independent court pertaining to personal religious laws of Ottoman subjects

In the Ottoman Empire, a millet (Turkish: [millet]; Ottoman Turkish: ملت, Arabic: مِلَّة) was an independent court of law pertaining to "personal law" under which non-Muslim populations belonging to confessional communities were allowed to rule themselves under their own laws (Christian canon law, or Jewish halakha).

Despite frequently being referred to as a "system", before the nineteenth century the organization of what are now retrospectively called millets in the Ottoman Empire was not at all systematic. Rather, non-Muslims were simply given a significant degree of autonomy within their own community, without an overarching structure for the millet as a whole. The notion of distinct millets corresponding to different religious communities within the empire would not emerge until the eighteenth century. Subsequently, the millet system was justified through numerous foundation myths linking it back to the time of Sultan Mehmed the Conqueror (r. 1451–81), although it is now understood that no such system existed in the fifteenth century. Heads of millets, or milletbaşı (Ethnarch), usually had absolute secular and ecclesiastical power over their communities, being answerable only to the Sultan.

During the 19th century rise of nationalism in the Ottoman Empire, as a result of the Tanzimat reforms (1839–76), the term was used for legally protected ethno-linguistic minority groups, similar to the way other countries use the word nation. During this era, the status of these groups, their relation to the central government, and their self-governance, were codified into constitutions, elevating the power of the laity at the expense of clergy. The word millet comes from the Arabic word millah (ملة) and literally means "nation". Abdulaziz Sachedina regards the millet system as an example of pre-modern religious pluralism, as the state recognized multiple different religious groups in exchange for some control over religious identification and the enforcement of orthodoxy. Notably, Ethnarchs principally conversed with the Foreign Ministry, as if they represented foreign nations, but after 1878 it was through the Justice Ministry.

Historian Johann Strauss wrote that the term "seems to be so essential for the understanding of the Ottoman system and especially the status of non-Muslims". Other authors interpret the millet system as one form of non-territorial autonomy and consider it as such a potentially universal solution to the modern issues of ethnic and religious diversity. According to Taner Akçam, the Ottoman state was "... based on the principle of heterogeneity and difference rather than homogeneity and sameness, [which] functioned in an opposite way to modern nation-states."

== Term ==
The term millet, which originates from the Arabic milla, had three basic meanings in Ottoman Turkish: religion, religious community and nation. The first sense derives from Quranic usage and is attested in Ottoman administrative documents into the 19th century. Benjamin Braude argues that in the earlier centuries of the Ottoman empire before the Tanzimat reforms, the word millet denoted the Muslim religious community or foreign Christians outside of the Ottoman Empire. This view is supported by Donald Quataert. In contrast, Michael Ursinus writes that the word was used to refer to non-Muslim subjects of the Ottoman Empire even before that time. The term was used inconsistently prior to the 19th century.

The systematic use of millet as designation for non-Muslim Ottoman communities dates from the reign of Sultan Mahmud II (r. 1808–1839) in the early 19th century, when official documentation came to reiterate that non-Muslim subjects were organized into three officially sanctioned millets: Greek Orthodox, Armenian, and Jewish. The bureaucrats of this era asserted that the millet system was a tradition dating back to the reign of Sultan Mehmed I (r. 1413–1421). Many historians have accepted this claim and assumed that a millet system of this form existed since early Ottoman times. Recent scholarship has cast doubt on this idea, showing that it was rather a later political innovation, which was introduced in the rhetorical garb of an ancient tradition. The Ottoman state used religion rather than ethnicity to define each millet, and people who study the Ottoman Empire do not define the Muslims as being in a millet.

The Ottoman Turkish version of the Ottoman Constitution of 1876 uses the word "millet", as do the Arabic and Persian versions; despite this, at the time the usage of the Arabic word "milla" was declining in favour of the word "ummah".

The Armenian, Greek, and Jewish residents did not use the word "millet" and instead described themselves as "nations" (French: nation, Armenian: ազգ (azg), Greek: Έθνος (ethnos), and Ladino: nasyon). The lack of use of the word "millet" among the Christian and Jewish minorities reflected in versions of the Ottoman Constitution in their respective languages: The French version of the Ottoman Constitution used the word "communauté" in the place of "millet", and so the others used words modeled after or based on the French: հասարակութիւն (hasarakut'iwn) in Armenian, общност/община (obstina) in Bulgarian, κοινότης (koinotēs) in Greek, and komunita in Judaeo-Spanish.

== Concept ==
The millet system is closely linked to Islamic rules on the treatment of non−Muslim minorities living under Islamic dominion (dhimmi). The Ottoman term specifically refers to the separate legal courts pertaining to personal law under which minorities were allowed to rule themselves (in cases not involving any Muslim) with fairly little interference from the Ottoman government.

People were bound to their millets by their religious affiliations (or their confessional communities), rather than their ethnic origins, according to the millet concept (excepting the Armenian case, until the modern era). The millets had a great deal of power – they set their own laws and collected and distributed their own taxes. All that was required was loyalty to the Empire. When a member of one millet committed a crime against a member of another, the law of the injured party applied, but the ruling Islamic majority being paramount, any dispute involving a Muslim fell under their sharia-based law.

Later, the perception of the millet concept was altered in the 19th century by the rise of nationalism within the Ottoman Empire.

== Position within the Ottoman hierarchy ==
The millet system combined substantial communal autonomy with an unequal imperial hierarchy. Armenians, Greeks, and Jews exercised religious, cultural, legal, fiscal and administrative autonomy, but non-Muslim communities remained politically subordinate. Ottoman law regarded non-Muslims as inferior subjects, denied them certain rights, excluded them from sections of the government and military, and required them to pay extra taxes (e.g. military-exemption tax). This hierarchy positioned Turks and Muslims as the ruling population. Even after the 1908 Young Turk Revolution, demands for equal citizenship from non-Muslims encountered resistance from those who regarded Muslim government over non-Muslims as an established Ottoman tradition. The Turkish journalist and politician Hüseyin Cahit described Turks as the millet-i hâkime (the "ruling nation") and argued that if Muslims wanted to preserve their way of life they should retain political authority rather than permit non-Muslims to acquire it.

== Specific Millets ==
Although the Ottoman administration of non-Muslim subjects was not uniform until the 19th century and varied according to region and group, it is possible to identify some common patterns for earlier epochs. Christian and Jewish communities were granted a large degree of autonomy. Tax collection, education, legal and religious affairs of these communities were administered by their own leaders. This enabled the Ottomans to rule over diverse peoples with "a minimum of resistance". The Jewish community, in particular, prospered under Ottoman rule, and its ranks were swelled with the arrival of Jews who were expelled from Spain. At the same time, non-Muslims were subject to several forms of discrimination and excluded from the Ottoman ruling elite. Armenians formed three millets under the Ottoman rule. A wide array of other groups such as Catholics, Karaites, and Samaritans was also represented.

=== Orthodox Christians ===
The Orthodox Christians were included in the Rum Millet (millet-i Rûm) or the "Roman nation", and enjoyed a certain autonomy. It was named after Roman ("Byzantine") subjects of the Ottoman Empire, but Orthodox Greeks, Bulgarians, Albanians, Georgians, Antiochians, Aromanians, Megleno-Romanians, Romanians, and Serbs were all considered part of the same millet despite their differences in ethnicity and language and despite the fact that the religious hierarchy was dominated by the Greeks. Nevertheless, ethnonyms never disappeared and some form of ethnic identity was preserved as evident from a Sultan's Firman from 1680, that lists the ethnic groups in the Balkans as follows: Greeks (Rum), Albanians (Arnaut), Serbs (Sirf), "Vlachs" (Eflak, referring to the Aromanians and Megleno-Romanians), and Bulgarians (Bulgar).

The Ecumenical Patriarch was recognized as the highest religious and political leader (millet-bashi, or ethnarch) of all Eastern Orthodox subjects of the Sultan, though in certain periods some major powers, such as Russia (under the 1774 Treaty of Küçük Kaynarca), or Britain claimed the rights of protection over the Ottoman Empire's Orthodox subjects. The Serbian Patriarchate of Peć and the Archbishopric of Ohrid, autonomous Orthodox Churches under the tutelage of the Ecumenical Patriarch, were taken over by the Greek Phanariots during the 18th century, in 1766 and 1767 respectively.

By the 19th century the Orthodox Christian millet was dominated by Greeks, which were worried of Bulgarian and Romanian autocephalism. Over the course of 1860–1862, a series of laws were produced by a constitutional committee which, taken together, make up the Basic Laws of the Greek Orthodox Millet.

=== Armenians ===
Until the 19th century, there was a single Armenian millet (millet-i Ermeniyân) which served all ethnic Armenians irrespective of whether they belonged to the Armenian Apostolic Church, the Armenian Catholic Church, or the Armenian Protestant Church (which was formed in the 19th century). Besides a religious role, this millet also played a political and cultural role. Namely, it bundled together all Armenian and some other groups, showcasing a shift from religious identity towards national identity. As a result of this, a type of hegemony emerged in which all groups that were under this millet had to conform to the norms imposed by the leader of the millet, who was appointed by the Sultan. This had a cultural, political, linguistic, and religious effect on all of these groups. Only later did separate Catholic millets emerge. Non-Armenians from churches which were theologically linked to the Armenian Church (by virtue of being non-Chalcedonians) were under the authority of the Armenian Patriarchate, although they maintained a separate hierarchy with their own Patriarchs; these groups included the Syriac Orthodox and the Copts.

Armenian Catholics and Armenian Protestants in 1850 (with British backing) separated from the Armenian Gregorian Millet to become their own millets. After the 1856 Imperial Reform edict, the Armenian Protestant Millet was the first millet to have a constitution sanctioned by the government, which was based on the principle of representative and lay control. Debate for a constitution among the Gregorian Armenians would be influenced by the Protestant Armenians'. The Armenian Gregorian Millet received a constitution on March 29, 1863, after several years of tensions within the Armenian community between Loussavorial and Khavarials and with the Porte.

=== Assyrians ===
Assyrians are referred to as 'Asuri' in the Turkish vernacular. Assyrians split by Christian sect were thus treated as separate ethnic groups for the Ottoman government. The Church of the East largely identifies as Assyrian, but the liturgical language is called Syriac, hence multiple 'millets' for Syriac speaking Assyrians arose as a consequence of the separation by Church affiliation, as was required by 19th century Ottoman law.

The Syriac Catholic community was recognized as its own millet in 1829 and the Chaldean Catholic community was recognized as its own millet in 1844. The Syriac Orthodox community in the Ottoman Empire was for long not recognized as its own millet, but part of the Armenian millet under the Armenian Patriarch. This meant that the Syriac Orthodox were subject to the hegemony of the Armenians linguistically, culturally, politically, and religiously. During the Tanzimat reforms (1839–78), the Syriac Orthodox were granted independent status with the recognition of their own millet in 1873.

=== Jews ===
Under the millet system the Jews were organized as a community on the basis of religion, alongside the other millets (e.g. Eastern Orthodox millet, Armenian millet, etc.). They were the most geographically spread group within the empire. Ottoman Jews enjoyed privileges similar to Christians in the Ottoman Empire. In the framework of the millet they had a considerable amount of administrative autonomy and were represented by the Hakham Bashi (Turkish: Hahambaşı حاخامباشی), who held broad powers to enact, judge, and enforce the laws among the Jews in the Ottoman Empire and often sat on the Sultan's divan. The Jewish millet received a constitution in 1865.

The Jews, like the other millet communities of the Ottoman Empire, were still considered "People of the book" and protected by the Sharia Law of Islam. However, while the Jews were not viewed in the eyes of the law as equals of Muslims, they were still treated relatively well at points during the Ottoman Empire. Norman Stillman explains that the prosperity of medieval Jews was closely tied to that of their Muslim governors. Stillman notes that during the time between the 9th and 13th centuries when Jewish culture blossomed, "medieval Islamic civilization was at its apogee". Given their rampant persecution in medieval Europe, many Jews looked favorably upon millet. In the late 19th century such groups as the Bilu, a group of young Russian Jews who were pioneers in the Zionist movement, proposed negotiating with the Sultan to allow a millet like settlement which would allow them greater independence in Palestine.

=== Roman Catholics ===
After the Fall of Constantinople, the only Latin Catholic group in the Sultan's domain were the Genoese who lived in the Byzantine capital. Over the next decades, Turkish armies pushed into the Balkans, overrunning the Catholic populations of both Albania, Bosnia, Croatia, Hungary and Montenegro.

The Melkite Catholics gained their autonomy as a religious community in 1848 by Sultan Abdulmecid. Bruce Masters claims that Melkite Catholics insisted that they had a millet of their own, that would grant them "sense of distinctiveness".

In the Orient, the 16th century saw the Maronites of Lebanon, the Latins of Palestine, and most of the Greek islands, which once held Latin Catholic communities, come under Turkish rule. Papal response to the loss of these communities was initially a call to the crusade, but the response from the European Catholic monarchs was weak: French interest, moreover, lay in an alliance with the Turks against the Habsburgs. Furthermore, the Catholics of the Ottoman world received a protector at the Porte in the person of the French ambassador. In this way the Roman Catholic millet was established at the start of the Tanzimat reforms.

==== Maronites ====
The Maronite Patriarch historically avoided the firman and millet system until patriarch Elias Peter Hoayek was forced to accept the firman in 1916, when Mount Lebanon fell under direct Ottoman authority, as protection from local leaders.

=== Protestants ===
During the Reformation, the Sultan of the Ottoman Empire was known for his tolerance of the Christian and Jewish faiths within his dominions, whereas the King of Spain did not tolerate the Protestant faith. Various religious refugees, such as the Huguenots, some Anglicans, Quakers, Anabaptists or even Jesuits or Capuchins were able to find refuge at Istanbul and in the Ottoman Empire, where they were given right of residence and worship. Further, the Ottomans supported the Calvinists in Transylvania and Hungary but also in France.

The Ottomans tolerated Protestant missionaries within their realm, so long as they limited their proselytizing to the Orthodox Christians.

== History ==
=== Use for Sassanid Empire ===
In a 1910 book William Ainger Wigram used the term melet in application to the Persian Sasanian Empire, arguing that the situation there was similar to the Ottoman millet system and no other term was readily available to describe it. Some other authors have also adopted this usage. The early Christians there formed the Church of the East (later known as the Nestorian Church after the Nestorian schism). The Church of the East's leader, the Catholicos or Patriarch of the East, was responsible to the Persian king for the Christians within the Empire. This system of maintaining the Christians as a protected religious community continued after the Islamic conquest of the Sassanids, and the community of Nestorian Christians flourished and was able to send missionaries far past the Empire's borders, reaching as far as China and India.

=== 19th century (Reformation Era) ===
In 1839 and 1856, reforms were attempted with the goal of creating equality between the religious communities of the Ottoman Empire. In the course of these reforms, new millets emerged, notably for Eastern Catholic and Protestant Christian communities. The heads of each millet and clerics in them were also to have their internal rule reviewed by the central government and to keep their power in check. Many clerics in the millet system pushed back against these reforms as they believed it was meant to weaken the millets and the power these clerics had built for themselves. These millets, refusing to give up any autonomy, slowed down the attempted reforms and their impact on the equality of religious communities.

==== Reformulation into Ottomanism ====
Before the turn of the 19th century, the millets had a great deal of power – they set their own laws and collected and distributed their own taxes. The Tanzimat reforms aimed to encourage Ottomanism among the subject nations and stop the rise of secessionist nationalist movements within the Ottoman Empire. The reforms tried to integrate non-Muslims and non-Turks more thoroughly into the Ottoman society with new laws and regulations, but failed.

In 1856, during the Tanzimat era, Sultan Abdulmejid I enacted the Hatt-ı Hümayun (modern Turkish Islahat Fermânı; "Firman of the Reforms"), which proclaimed freedom of religion and civil equality of all religious communities. It further granted the authorities in each millet greater privileges and self-governing powers, but also required oaths of allegiance to the Sultan.

In March 1863, the Sultan enacted the "Regulation of the Armenian Nation" (Turkish: Nizâmnâme−i Millet−i Ermeniyân): a constitution for the Armenian Orthodox Gregorian nation (millet) of that time. This document was drawn up by Armenian intelligentsia, which sought to curb the powers of the Armenian Patriarch and nobility. It created an Armenian National Assembly.

These two reforms, which were theoretically perfect examples of social change by law, caused serious stress on the Ottoman political and administrative structure.

==== Effect of Protectorate of missions ====
The Ottoman System lost important domestic powers under the Capitulations of the Ottoman Empire. Many foreigners resident in the Empire were not subject to its laws, but rather those of their homelands. In addition, European powers became formal Protectors of certain groups in the empire: Russia of Eastern Orthodox groups, France of Roman Catholics, and Great Britain of Jews and other groups.

Russia and Britain competed for the Armenians; the Eastern Orthodox perceived American Protestants, who had over 100 missionaries established in Anatolia by World War I, as weakening their own teaching.

These religious activities, subsidized by the governments of western nations, were not devoid of political goals, such in the case of candlestick wars of 1847, which eventually led in 1854 to the Crimean War. Tension began among the Catholic and Orthodox monks in Palestine with France channeling resources to increase its influence in the region from 1840. Repairs to shrines were important for the sects as they were linked to the possession of keys to the shrines. Notes were given by the protectorates, including the French, to the Ottoman capital about the governor; he was condemned as he had to defend the Church of the Holy Sepulchre by placing soldiers inside the temple because of the "candlestick wars", eliminating the change of keys. Successive Ottoman governments had issued edicts granting primacy of access to different Christian groups which vied for control of Jerusalem's holy sites.

==== Effect of nationalism ====
Under the original design, the multi-faced structure of the millet system was unified under the House of Osman. The rise of nationalism in Europe under the influence of the French Revolution had extended to the Ottoman Empire during the 19th century. Each millet became increasingly independent with the establishment of its own schools, churches, hospitals and other facilities. These activities effectively moved the Christian population outside the framework of the Ottoman political system.

The Ottoman millet system (citizenship) began to degrade with increasing identification of religious creed with ethnic nationality. The interaction of ideas of French revolution with the millet system created a strain of thought (a new form of personal identification) which made nationality synonymous with religion under the Ottoman flag. It was impossible to hold the system or prevent Clash of Civilizations when the Armenian national liberation movement expressed itself within the Armenian church. Patriarch Nerses Varjabedyan expressed his position on Ottoman Armenians to the British Foreign Secretary, Lord Salisbury on 13 April 1878.

It is no longer possible for the Armenians and the Turks to live together. Only a Christian administration can provide the equality, justice and the freedom of conscience. A Christian administration should replace the Muslim administration. Armenia (Eastern Anatolia) and Kilikya, are the regions where the Christian administration should be founded... The Turkish Armenians want this... That is, a Christian administration is demanded in Turkish Armenia, as in Lebanon.

=== Post-Ottoman use ===
Today a version of religion-based legal pluralism resembling the millet system still persists in varying forms in some post-Ottoman countries like Iraq, Syria, Jordan, Lebanon, Israel, the Palestinian Authority, Egypt, and Greece (for religious minorities), which observe the principle of separate personal courts and/or laws for every recognized religious community and reserved seats in the parliament. Some legal systems which developed outside the Ottoman Empire, such as those in India, Iran, Pakistan, and Bangladesh, display similar characteristics.

In Egypt for instance, the application of family law – including marriage, divorce, alimony, child custody, inheritance, and burial – is based on an individual's religious beliefs. In the practice of family law, the State recognizes only the three "heavenly religions": Islam, Christianity, and Judaism. Muslim families are subject to the Personal Status Law, which draws on Sharia. Christian families are subject to canon law, and Jewish families are subject to Jewish law. In cases of family law disputes involving a marriage between a Christian woman and a Muslim man, the courts apply the Personal Status Law.

Israel, too, keeps a system based on the Ottoman millet, in which personal status is based on a person's belonging to a religious community. The state of Israel – on the basis of laws inherited from Ottoman times and retained both under British rule and by independent Israel – reserves the right to recognise some communities but not others. Thus, Orthodox Judaism is officially recognised in Israel, while Reform Rabbis and Conservative Rabbis are not recognised and cannot perform marriages. Israel recognised the Druze and Baháʼí as separate communities, which the Ottomans and British had not – due mainly to political considerations. Also, the state of Israel reserves the right to determine to which community a person belongs, and officially register him or her accordingly – even when the person concerned objects to being part of a religious community (e.g., staunch atheists of Jewish origin are registered as members of the Jewish religious community, a practice derived ultimately from the fact that the millet ultimately designated a person's ethnicity more than a person's beliefs).

Israeli secularists such as Shulamit Aloni and Uri Avnery often protested and called for abolition of this Ottoman remnant, and its replacement by a system modeled on that of the United States where religious affiliation is considered a person's private business in which the state should not interfere. However, all such proposals have been defeated.

Greece recognizes only a Muslim minority, and no ethnic or national minorities, such as Turks, Pomaks, or Bulgarians. This is the result of several international treaties as the Convention Concerning the Exchange of Greek and Turkish Populations of 1923 and of the Treaty of Lausanne of 1924, when the old millet categories were used for the exchange between Greece and Turkey of the Greek Orthodox population in Turkey and Muslims in Greece. The categories were also used to establish the protection of the two remaining recognized minorities, the "Muslims of Western Thrace" (Turks, Pomaks, and Roms) and the "Greek Orthodox of Istanbul". In 1924, upon the League of Nations' demand, a bilateral Bulgarian-Greek agreement was signed, known as the Politis–Kalfov Protocol, recognizing the "Greek Slavophones" as Bulgarians and guaranteeing their protection. On 2 February 1925, the Greek parliament, claiming pressure from the Kingdom of Yugoslavia, which threatened to renounce the Greek–Serbian Alliance of 1913, refused to ratify the agreement; the refusal lasted until 10 June 1925. Under the 1927 Mollov-Kafantaris Agreement, the bulk of the Slavic-speaking population in Greece left for Bulgaria.

==== Current meaning of the word ====
Today, the word "millet" means "nation" or "people" in Turkish, e.g. Türk milleti ("Turkish nation"), İngiliz milleti ("English nation"), etc. It also retains its use as a religious and ethnic classification; it can also be used as a slang to classify people belonging to a particular group (not necessarily religious or ethnic), such as dolmuşçu milleti ("taxibus drivers") or kadın milleti ("women folk").

== See also ==
- Consistory (Protestantism)
- Culture of the Ottoman Empire
- History of the Ottoman Empire
- Devşirme system, Ottoman practice of forcibly taking Christian boys in order to be raised to serve the state
- Jizyah, tax levied on non-Muslims based on Islamic law
- Pillarisation, separation of a society into groups by religion and associated political beliefs
- Kadi (Ottoman Empire), Ottoman official and judge
- Qadi, Islamic judge
- Mufti, Islamic jurist

== Bibliography ==
- Braude, Benjamin (1982). "Foundation Myths of the Millet System". In Braude, Benjamin; Bernard Lewis (eds.). Christians and Jews in the Ottoman Empire. Vol. 1. New York: Holmes & Meier. pp. 69–90. ISBN 978-0-8419-0519-1.
- Davison, Roderic (1963), Reform in the Ottoman Empire: 1856-1876, Princeton, New Jersey: Princeton University Press
- Goffman, Daniel (2002). The Ottoman Empire and Early Modern Europe. Cambridge University Press. ISBN 978-0-521-45908-2.
- Masters, Bruce (2001). Christians and Jews in the Ottoman Arab World: The Roots of Sectarianism. Cambridge: Cambridge University Press. ISBN 978-0-521-80333-5.
- Masters, Bruce (2009). "Millet". In Ágoston, Gábor; Bruce Masters (eds.). Encyclopedia of the Ottoman Empire. pp. 383–4.
- Schmidt, Benjamin (2001). Innocence Abroad: The Dutch Imagination and the New World, 1570-1670. Cambridge, UK: Cambridge University Press. ISBN 978-0-521-80408-0.
