= Zvi Yehuda =

Israeli politician (1887–1965)

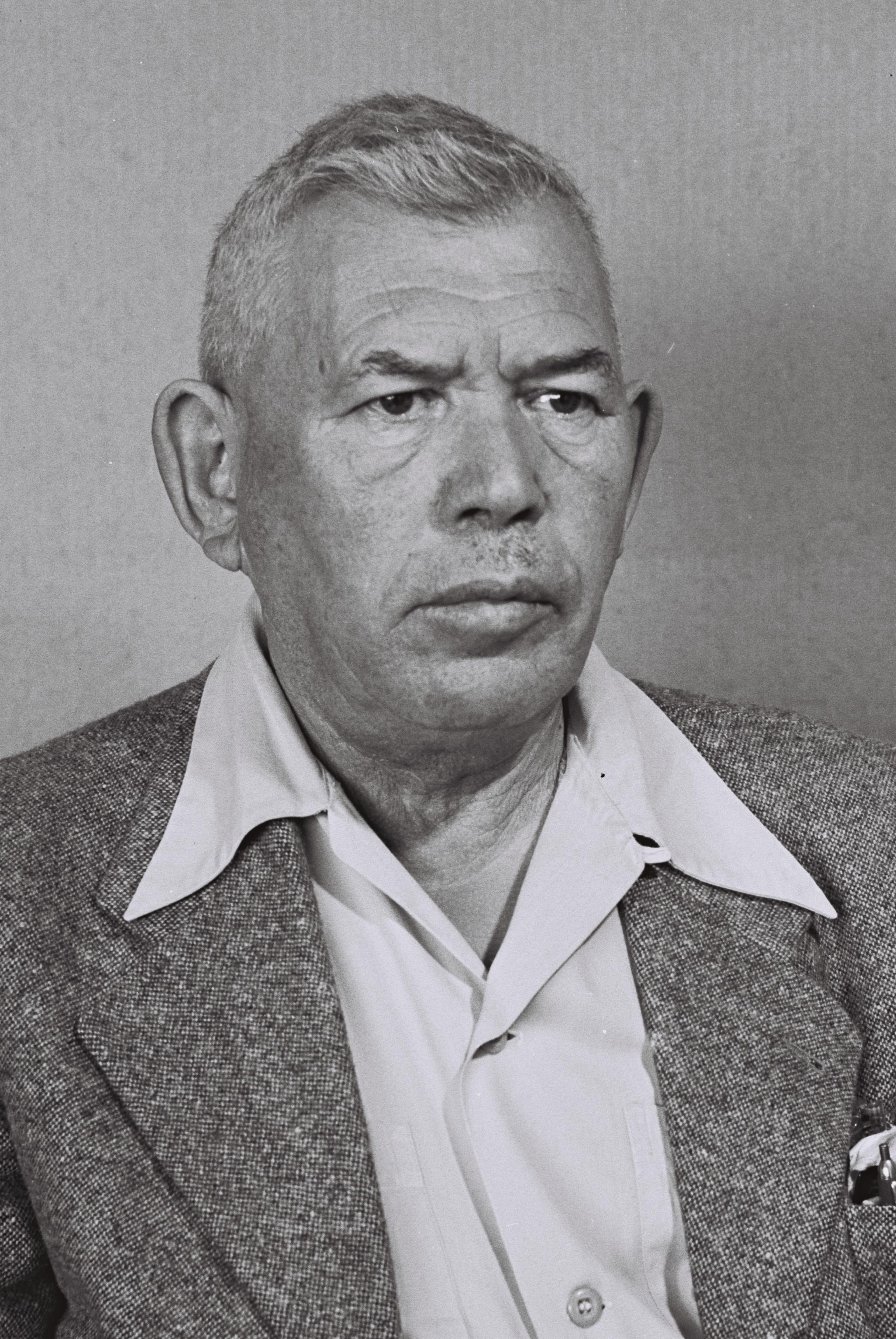
- Yehuda in 1956

Faction represented in the Knesset
- 1949–1951: Mapai

Personal details
- Born: 15 August 1887 Uman, Russian Empire
- Died: 3 October 1965 (aged 78)

Zvi Yehuda (Hebrew: צְבִי יְהוּדָה; 15 August 1887 – 3 October 1965) was a Zionist activist and later an Israeli politician.

== Biography ==
Born Zvi Zaltzman in Uman in the Russian Empire (today in Ukraine), Yehuda organised two Zionist youth groups in Uman, Degel Zion and Tzeiri Zion. In 1906 he made emigrated to Ottoman-controlled Palestine, and was amongst the founders of Kvutzat Kinneret in 1908. In 1912 he helped establish Degania, the first kibbutz. During World War I he served as a member of the Galilee Workers Committee.

In 1920 Yehuda travelled to Europe to help immigrants of the Third Aliyah. The following year he helped found Nahalal, the first moshav ovdim, and was a director of the Moshav fund and a member of the Moshavim Movement's secretariat, as well as the Farmers Federation and Histadrut trade union. He helped establish Hapoel Hatzair movement, and was a member of its central committee. He also helped establish Hapoel Hatzair and Tzeiri Zion in the United States.

Prior to the 1949 Constitutional Assembly elections he was placed 37th on the Mapai list, and was elected as the party won 46 seats. However, he was not on the Mapai list for the 1951 elections. He died in 1965 and was buried in Nahalal Cemetery.

His wife was Nettie Antonow, daughter of Ben-Zion Antonow and Fanny Sharegordsky Antonow, founders of Ramat Gan, Israel.
