= Armenian National Constitution =

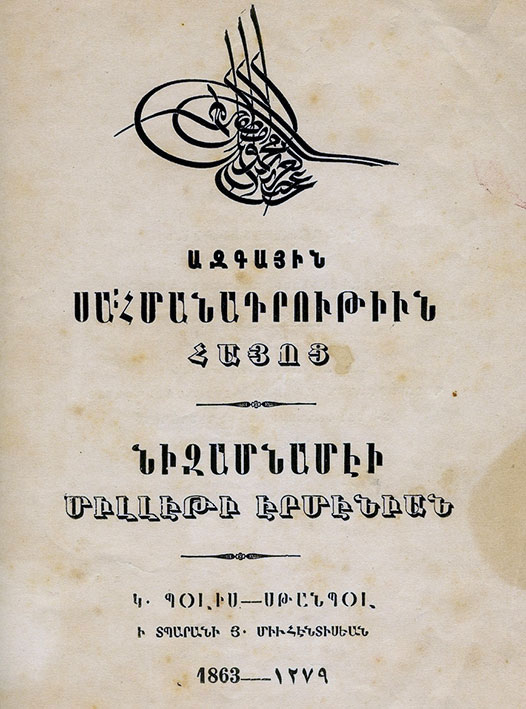
Cover of the Armenian version of the Armenian National Constitution (read online)

English version by Harry Finnis Blosse Lynch (1901)

Ottoman Turkish version from the Düstur

The Armenian National Constitution (Armenian: Հայ ազգային սահմանադրութիւն, romanized: Hay azkayin sahmanatroutioun; French: Constitution nationale arménienne) or Regulation of the Armenian Nation (Ottoman Turkish: نظامنامهٔ ملّت ارمنیان, romanized: Nizâmnâme-i Millet-i Ermeniyân) was a constitution in the Ottoman Empire for members of the Gregorian Armenian millet. Promulgated in 1863, it defined the powers of the Armenian Patriarch, a newly formed Armenian National Assembly, and lay members. This code is still active among Armenian Church in diaspora. The Ottoman Turkish version was published in the Düstur. Other constitutions were promulgated for the Catholic Armenian and the Protestant Armenian millets.

The document itself was called a "constitution" in Armenian, while the Ottoman Turkish version was instead called a "regulation" on the millet.

== Background ==
Until the promulgation of the Edict of Gülhane in 1839, the patriarch held supreme power over his flock. Its authority over the clergy and civil administration being absolute, the patriarch could imprison or exile Armenians at will; and while they were compelled to secure the consent of the Sultan to imprison or exile laymen of their community, the necessary firman was easily obtained. The patriarchal system of government, in placing civil powers in the hands of high ecclesiastics, was an outcome of the fact that the Sultan made no distinction between church and community, and often lent the weight of its authority to maintain the integrity of the church.

=== Early reform ===
In the 18th century, the Armenian community underwent a cultural renaissance known as the Armenian national awakening. This involved a revival of classical Armenian learning, and the interpretation of new ideas coming from Western Europe, particularly the Enlightenment and the events of the French Revolution. With the start of the 19th century there was also the influence of American and English missionaries, which spawned the creation of the small Armenian Protestant millet. Armenian reformers that became inspired from their studies in time in Paris were known as Loussavorial, whereas conservatives were known as Khavarial.

On the eve of the Tanzimat era, the patriarch was dominated by the wealthy Armenian urban aristocracy: the amira. Newly rich artisans were discontent from their lack of political influence, and pushed for reform in the civil administration. The Armenian college question, during which the Gülhane Edict was issued, was a reflection of the tension between the artisans and banking amira: sarrafs. Though the artisans lost the fight, the patriarch delegated his power of the purse to an elected board of 24 artisans to manage millet finances. Without banker support however, this institution dissolved by 1842. In 1844, Patriarch Matteos II attempted to resolve the issue by establishing a council that included both tradesmen and bankers. However the sarrafs continued to cause trouble for the tradesmen. In 1847, Matteos created, and the Porte sanctioned, two councils: one civil and one ecclesiastical, to manage millet affairs, which continued for ten years. However dissatisfaction with the state of affairs in the civil administration persisted, and the example of the radically representative Protestant millet constitution pushed Gregorian church members to further pro-lay reform, lest church members convert to the join the Protestant millet.

=== Drafting ===
The 1856 Imperial Reform Edict, which sought to bring equality among all Ottomans, also caused discontentment in the Armenian Patriarchate. Armenian reformers wanted to abolish what they saw as oppression by the amira class, by drawing up a new 'National Regulation'.

The first draft (of three) of the Armenian constitution was written by a bourgeois leadership which previously served on an educational committee in 1853. The Armenian Gregorian Millet received a constitution in 1857, but due to tensions within the Armenian community between the Loussavorials and Khavarials and with the Porte, it had to be rewritten several times, and a final draft was in effect for only two months. On June 5 1860, the "Code of Regulations" was drafted by a constitutional committee made up of members of the Armenian intelligentsia (Dr. Nahabet Rusinian, Dr. Servichen, Nigoghos Balian, Krikor Odian and Krikor Margosian), which sought to define the powers of the Patriarch. This code was adopted, but lasted for just 16 months.

In 1862 Aali Pasha and the acting Patriarch Stepan Maghakyan initiated the formation of another constitutional committee, but when the Porte didn't immediately accept it, a mob of Armenian tradesmen stormed the Patriarchate and vandalized its furniture, until Turkish troops were sent to restore order. The government of Sultan Abdülaziz ratified it (with some minor changes) by a firman, and a constitutional committee accepted an Armenian Gregorian millet constitution on March 29, 1863. This constitution was based on the principle of representation, and limited the powers of the Patriarch and the clergy through the establishment of an Armenian National Assembly, which now elected the Patriarch and appointed members to a civil and an ecclesiastical council.

== Provisions ==
The Armenian National Constitution was composed of 150 articles which defined the powers of the Patriarch, his position in the Armenian Millet and the Ottoman Empire, and a newly formed Armenian National Assembly. The Patriarch shared his powers with the National Assembly and was limited by the Constitution. He perceived the changes as an erosion of his community.

The National Assembly was made up of 140 members, 20 of which were clergymen. Constantinople was disproportionately represented in the chamber, as 80 of the lay deputies and all the clergy were elected from the capital. Therefore, despite making up 90% of the Armenian population, those in the provinces were represented by 2/7ths of the assembly. Suffrage was granted to tax paying members of the Gregorian church. Though gender was not mentioned, women's suffrage was not considered. Electoral law in the capital saw voters choosing candidates prepared by an electoral council in each quarter of the city. Provincial elections had three stages: voters voted for a provincial assembly which then voted for a list of candidates prepared by local councils.

Further democratization was accomplished in the provinces, with metropolitans being elected by provincial assemblies, which were dominated by laity. Taxation was based on ability to pay, and used to upkeep local administration.

== Results ==
Turnout for elections for the national assembly were typically low. Despite the lack of provincial representation, the National Assembly was the most visible place for deputies to voice complaints of tax reforms and Kurdish marauding.

Parliamentary governance was initially dysfunctional, as the amira and clergy objected to the privileges they lost. When a dispute between the ecclesiastical and civil councils proved too difficult to disentangle, the Porte suspended the constitution from 1866-1869. But from 1869-1892, the Armenian Constitution functioned, and the general assembly met, regularly. It was again suspended in 1892 after tensions flared with Ottoman government, but was reinstated following the Young Turk Revolution in 1908.

== Analysis ==
The Armenian National Constitution was seen as a milestone by Armenian reformers. It attempted to define Armenia as a modern nation. The reforms which resulted in the Armenian National Assembly came about as individual Armenians and pressure groups petitioned for assistance from the Porte against injustices perpetuated by the Kurds and corrupt officialdom. At the beginning the relations between the Armenian National Assembly and the Porte were positive, but in the 1860s, the Ottomans, having crushed Kurdish resistance, no longer needed Armenian support, and the Empire became less responsive to Armenian claims.

Henry Finnis Blosse Lynch, author of Armenia, Travels and Studies, wrote in the second volume, published in 1901, that the Armenian National Constitution was "practically in abeyance owing to the strained relations at present existing between the Palace and the Armenians."

== Sources ==
- Davison, Roderic (1963), Reform in the Ottoman Empire: 1856-1876, Princeton, New Jersey: Princeton University Press

=== References ===
- Lynch, Harry Finnis Blosse (1901). "Appendix I: National Constitution of the Armenians in the Turkish Empire". Armenia, Travels and Studies. Vol. 2. Longmans, Green and Co. p. 445-467. (PDF p. 573-595/644)
