= Krikor Odian =

Ottoman Armenian jurist, politician, and writer (1834–1887)

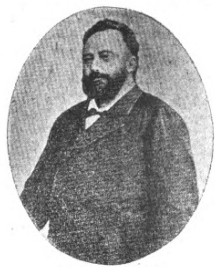
Krikor Odian

Krikor Odian (Armenian: Գրիգոր Օտեան, December 9, 1834 Istanbul, Ottoman Empire - August 6, 1887, Paris, France) was an Ottoman Armenian jurist, politician, and writer.

He was a key figure in the establishment of the Armenian National Constitution and the Ottoman constitution of 1876. He was the uncle of the famed Armenian playwright and writer Yervant Odian.
