= Servitchen =

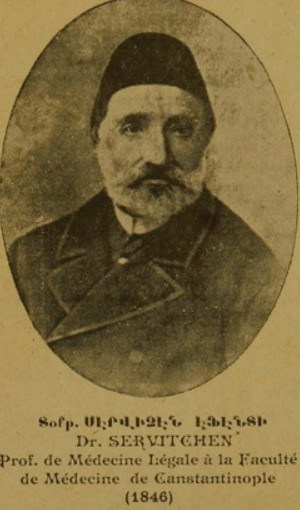

Serovpe (Servitchen) Vitchenian (born Constantinople, Ottoman Empire 1815 – died 1897) was a prominent Ottoman Armenian physician, educator, journalist, writer, and politician. He was the founder of the first Ottoman medical journal. He was also a key figure in the promulgation of the Armenian National Constitution in 1863.
