= Armenian millet =

Ethnoreligious community of the Armenian Apostolic Church

The Armenian millet (Turkish: Ermeni milleti, Millet-i Ermeniyân) or the Armenian Gregorian Millet was the Ottoman millet (autonomous ethnoreligious community) of the Armenian Apostolic Church. Armenian communities within the Armenian highlands, long predated Ottoman rule. After conquering these territories, the Ottomans gradually incorporated those communities into their confessional administration. The traditional turning point was 1461, when Sultan Mehmed II appointed the Armenian Hovakim as patriarch in Constantinople, although the patriarch’s wider authority over Ottoman Armenians developed gradually over later centuries.

Sultan Mehmet II separated the Armenian millet from the Greek Orthodox millet because of the disagreements that they had over orthodoxy. After the establishment of the Armenian Patriarchate in Constantinople — who served as the leader or milletbaşı of the Armenian millet — members of the millet were able to handle things autonomously and had the legal status to bring a case to the Islamic courts. Older Armenian centers such as the Catholicosates of Etchmiadzin and Cilicia continued to operate, while Constantinople’s authority under the Armenian Patriarchate expanded gradually. Under the millet system, Ottoman Armenians had institutions such as courts of law, schools, prisons, and hospitals for their own community.

The Tanzimat era saw reformers, Ottoman statesmen and non-Muslim reformers alike, attempt to codify the law under the principle of the doctrine of equality. Secular law codes were promulgated in both the Porte and the Patriarchate which saw laity increase in power at the expense of the clergy. This was none more exemplified with the Armenian National Constitution. Up until 1878, the Armenian millet was considered the millet-i sadıka or the "loyal millet" in the Ottoman Empire.

In 1915, the Tehcir Law marked the beginning of the Armenian genocide. Later, on 28 July 1916, the Ottoman government dissolved the Armenian Patriarchate of Constantinople. The Armenian millet effectively ended with the Ottoman Empire and the establishment of the Turkish Republic in 1923. The remaining legal autonomy of the millet system was eliminated with Turkey’s secular Civil Code in 1926.

== Origin ==
Armenian communities long predated Ottoman rule, maintaining churches, monasteries, dioceses, guilds, and local leadership across the Armenian Highlands. After conquering these territories, the Ottomans gradually incorporated those communities into their confessional administration. The traditional turning point was 1461, when Mehmed II appointed Hovakim as patriarch in Constantinople, although the patriarch’s wider authority developed gradually over later centuries.

The Armenian millet initially included not just Armenians in the Ottoman Empire but members of other Oriental Orthodox and Nestorian churches including those of Coptic, Chaldean Catholic, Ethiopian Orthodox Tewahedo, Syriac Orthodox, and the Assyrian sects although there is little evidence that the Armenian millet ever wielded actual authority over these non-Armenian groups, and most of these non-Armenian groups obtained their own millet in the nineteenth century. The Armenian Catholic and Armenian Protestants also obtained their own millets in 1831 and 1850 respectively.

== Governing structure before Gülhane ==
Until the promulgation of the Edict of Gülhane in 1839, the patriarch, within limits, possessed absolute penal authority over the Armenian people. At the capital, the patriarchate had its own jail and maintained a small police force. Its authority over the clergy and civil administration being absolute, the patriarch could imprison or exile Armenians at will; and while they were compelled to secure the consent of the Sultan to imprison or exile laymen of their community, the necessary firman was easily obtained. The patriarchal system of government, in placing civil powers in the hands of high ecclesiastics, was an outcome of the fact that the Sultan made no distinction between church and community, and often lent the weight of its authority to maintain the integrity of the church.

In the 18th century, the Armenian community underwent a cultural renaissance known as the Armenian national awakening. This involved a revival of classical Armenian learning, and the interpretation of new ideas coming from Western Europe, particularly the Enlightenment and the events of the French Revolution. With the start of the 19th century there was also the influence of American and English missionaries, which eventually spawned the creation of the small Armenian Protestant millet. During this time, Armenian reformers that became inspired from their studies in time in Paris were known as Loussavorial, where as conservatives were Khavarial.

== Constitution ==
On 29 March, 1863, the Sublime Porte finally approved, and a constitutional committee accepted, an Armenian Gregorian millet constitution, known as the Armenian National Constitution. This constitution, based on the principle of representation, limited the powers of the Patriarch and the clergy, through the opening of an Armenian National Assembly, which now elected the Patriarch and appointed members to an ecclesiastical and a civil council. Metropolitans were elected by provincial assemblies, which were dominated by laity. Taxation was based on ability to pay, and used to upkeep local administration.

The Porte suspended the constitution from 1866–1869. But from 1869–1892, the Armenian Constitution functioned, and the general assembly met, regularly. Along with the Ottoman Constitution it was again suspended in 1892 after tensions flared with Ottoman government, but was reinstated following the Young Turk Revolution in 1908.

== Decline ==
The authority wielded by the Armenian millet was progressively weakened by Ottoman centralization, common citizenship reforms and Armenian political nationalism. It effectively collapsed following the 1915 Armenian genocide, which destroyed much of its population, property, leadership, and provincial institutional network. Although the Ottoman government formally dissolved the Patriarchate in July 1916. In 1919 the Armenian Patriarchate, together with the Greek Patriarchate, renounced its flock as subjects of the Ottoman Empire. In 1926, Turkey’s Turkey’s secular Civil Code eliminated the remaining civil and personal-law authority of the millet system.

== See also ==
- Armenians in Turkey
- Western Armenia

== Sources ==
- Davison, Roderic (1963), Reform in the Ottoman Empire: 1856–1876, Princeton, New Jersey: Princeton University Press
- Suny, Ronald Grigor (2015). 'They Can Live in the Desert but Nowhere Else': A History of the Armenian Genocide. Princeton University Press. ISBN 978-1-4008-6558-1.
- Lay summary in: Ronald Grigor Suny (26 May 2015). "Armenian Genocide". 1914–1918-online. International Encyclopedia of the First World War.
- Travlos, Konstantinos (2020). Salvation and Catastrophe: The Greek-Turkish War, 1919–1922. Lexington Books. ISBN 9781498585088.
