= Armenian National Assembly =

The Armenian National Assembly was the governing body of the Armenian millet in the Ottoman Empire, established by the Armenian National Constitution of 1863.

== Elections ==
Tax paying members of the Armenian Gregorian church were given suffrage to elect representatives to the National Assembly, which included 140 yerespokhan, or deputies, 20 of whom were from the clergy. Voters were to elect 140 out of a list of 220.

Constantinople was disproportionately represented in the chamber, as 80 of the lay deputies and all the clergy were elected from the capital. Therefore, despite making up 90% of the Armenian population, those in the provinces were represented by 2/7ths of the assembly. Suffrage was granted to tax paying members of the Gregorian church. Electoral law in the capital saw voters choosing candidates prepared by an electoral council in each quarter of the city. Provincial elections had three stages: voters voted for a provincial assembly which then voted for a list of candidates prepared by local councils.

== Procedures ==
The National Assembly elected the patriarch and supervised his activities. In addition, a religious council of 12 members, administered monasteries, donations, and hospitals. It also elected a civil assembly of 20 members, which in turn appointed two councils: a judicial council, chaired by a patriarchal vicar, and a council for educational affairs. Other committees are appointed in the areas of finance, expenditures and taxes, social litigation, and other financial and legal matters. Armenians were required to participate in the elections of the patriarch and the community councils through their representatives, as well as to pay taxes in order to preserve and defend their rights.

The National Assembly was a platform which Armenian representatives took to highlight government corruption and abuses by Kurdish tribes. In 1871 a commission of 8 members half lay and half clerical, chaired by the Archbishop of Nicomedia Nerses, researched and reported the abuses and exactions suffered by the Christian populations of Armenia, and proposed the necessary measures to put an end to the state affairs. In 1913, a memorandum was dispatched to the Grand Vizier Mahmud Shevket Pasha on the difficult disposition of the Armenians in the Empire.

The national assembly met into the 1910s, with its last meeting being July 4, 1914.

== List of notable members ==
- Nahapet Rusinian
- Gabriel Noradoungian
- Haig Tiriakian
- Krikor Zohrap

== Sources ==
- Davison, Roderic (1963), Reform in the Ottoman Empire: 1856-1876, Princeton, New Jersey: Princeton University Press
- Raymond Kévorkian (2006). Le Génocide des Arméniens (in French). Éditions Odile Jacob. p. 1007. ISBN 978-2-7381-1830-1.
- Mahé, Annie; Mahé, Jean-Pierre (2012). Histoire de l'Arménie des origines à nos jours. Pour l'histoire (in French). Paris: Éditions Perrin. p. 432-433. ISBN 978-2-262-02675-2. BNF: 42803423.
