= Languages of the Ottoman Empire =

Languages of the former empire and its peoples

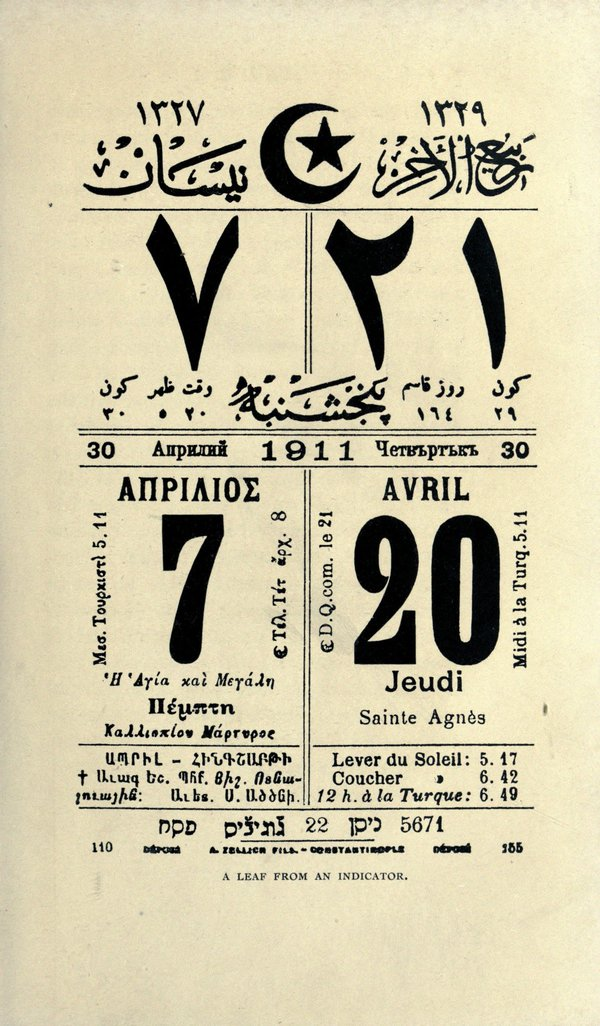
- 1911 Ottoman calendar in Ottoman Turkish, Arabic, Greek, Armenian, Hebrew/Judeo-Spanish, French and Bulgarian
- Official: Ottoman Turkish
- Recognised: Arabic, Persian,
- Minority: Acehnese, (Note: In Aceh Sultanate which was the easternmost Ottoman vassal.) Albanian, Armenian, Aromanian, Assyrian Neo-Aramaic (Suret), Western Neo-Aramaic, Berber (Tamazight), Bulgarian, Cappadocian Greek, all Caucasian languages, Coptic, Chagatai Turkic, Crimean Tatar, Crimean Gothic, Domari, Gagauz, Georgian, German, Greek, Hebrew, Hungarian, Italian, Judeo-Arabic, Judeo-Aramaic, Judaeo-Spanish, Kurdish, Latin, (Note: In Republic of Ragusa which was under Ottoman protection.) Laz, Megleno-Romanian, Polish, Pontic Greek, Romanian, Russian, Ruthenian, Serbian, Slovak, Ukrainian, Urum, Yevanic, Zazaki
- Foreign: Italian, French

The language of the court and government of the Ottoman Empire was Ottoman Turkish, but many other languages were actually spoken throughout the huge empire. The Ottomans had three main languages, known as "Alsina-i Thalātha" (The Three Languages), that were common to Ottoman readers: Ottoman Turkish, Arabic and Persian. Turkish was spoken by the majority of the people in Anatolia and was also the language spoken by the Ottoman dynasty; Persian was initially a literary and high-court language used by the educated in the Ottoman Empire before being displaced by Ottoman Turkish; and Arabic, which was the legal and religious language of the empire, was also spoken regionally, mainly in Arabia, North Africa, Mesopotamia and the Levant.

Although the minorities of the Ottoman Empire were free to use their language amongst themselves, if they needed to communicate with the government they had to use Ottoman Turkish. Some ordinary people had to hire special "request-writers" (arzuhâlcis) to be able to communicate with the government. In small towns where several ethnicities lived together, the people would often speak each other's languages. In cosmopolitan cities, people often spoke their family languages, and many non-ethnic Turks spoke Turkish as a second language. Educated Ottoman Turks spoke Arabic and/or Persian, as these were the main non-Turkish languages in the pre-Tanzimat era.

Italian seems to have remained the best known European language among Turks for some time, and as late as the nineteenth century (B.Lewis “The muslim discovery of Europe”, III On language and translation). The original version of the Treaty of Küçük Kaynarca (1774) between the Ottoman and Russian empires was in Italian and was later translated in Russian and Turkish.

In the last two centuries, French and English emerged as popular languages, especially among the Christian Levantine communities. The elite learned French at school, and used European products as a fashion statement. The use of Ottoman Turkish for science and literature grew steadily under the Ottomans, while Persian declined in those functions. During this period, Ottoman Turkish gained many loanwords from Arabic and Persian.

Linguistic groups were varied and overlapping. In the Balkan Peninsula, Slavic, Greek and Albanian speakers were the majority, but there were substantial communities of Turks and Romance-speaking Romanians, Aromanians and Megleno-Romanians. In most of Anatolia, Turkish was the majority language, but Greek and Armenian—and in the east and southeast, Kurdish and Aramaic—were also spoken. In Syria, Iraq, Arabia, Egypt and North Africa, most of the population spoke varieties of Arabic while elites spoke Turkish. However, in no province of the Empire was a single language spoken exclusively.

== Translations of government documents ==
As a result of having multiple linguistic groups, the Ottoman authorities had government documents translated into other languages, especially in the pre-Tanzimat era. Some translators were renowned in their language groups while others chose not to state their names in their works. Documents translated into minority languages include the Edict of Gülhane, the Ottoman Reform Edict of 1856, the Ottoman Penal Code (Ceza Kanunnamesi), the Ottoman Commercial Code (Ticaret Kanunnamesi), the Provincial Reform Law (Vilayet Kanunnamesi), the Ottoman Code of Public Laws (Düstur), the Mecelle, and the Ottoman Constitution of 1876.

Because of the many linguistic communities in the Empire, it was important for the government to have officials that could speak and translate official government documents, communicate with foreign ambassadors, and even write books in foreign languages. These were called dragomans. Many of them were some of the highest ranking officials in the Ottoman Empire. Their translated and published works often generated interest in the Ottoman Empire in Europe.

== Elsine-i Selâse ==
=== Ottoman Turkish ===
Throughout the empire's history, Turkish enjoyed official status, having an important role as the lingua franca of the government. Written in Perso-Arabic script, Ottoman Turkish contained many loanwords from Arabic and Persian, marking significant difference from the Turkish that rural Turks used. The 1876 Constitution of the Ottoman Empire stated that Ottoman Turkish was the official language of the government and that in order to take a public office post, one had to master Ottoman Turkish. Until the 19th century, the language is referred to as simply "Turkish".

The history of Ottoman Turkish can largely be seen through three eras:

Eski Osmanlı Türkçesi اسكی عثمانلی توركچه‌سی (Old Ottoman Turkish) was a form of Turkish used until the 16th century that was very similar to the language that the Seljuks used.

Orta Osmanlı Türkçesi اورتا عثمانلی توركچه‌سی (Middle Ottoman Turkish) was the language of poetry and administration until the Tanzimat reforms in the mid-19th century.

Yeni Osmanlı Türkçesi یڭی عثمانلی توركچه‌سی (New Ottoman Turkish) was a form from the 1850s into the 20th century influenced by journalism and Western literature.

The grammar of Ottoman Turkish is not different from modern-day Turkish. The differences between the two are the Persian and Arabic loan-words that were wiped out by Ataturk's reforms, replaced with Turkish equivalents; and the use of the Perso-Arabic instead of the Latin script.

Vekayi-i giridiyye, a newspaper published in Egypt after 1830, was the first newspaper in the Turkish language in the empire. It was published in both Turkish and Greek.

At the time of the empire, Turkish fluency was low among Jewish people, who interacted with their millet in other languages and who had a lack of opportunity to learn Turkish.

=== Arabic ===
Arabic was the liturgical and legal language of the empire, being one of the two major languages (along with Ottoman Turkish) for Ilm (Ottoman Turkish: ulûm).

Arabic was the language taught in the Madaris. The Ottoman legal apparatus relied on old Arabic Hanafi legal texts, which remained untranslated until the late empire, and Ottoman jurists would also continue to author new jurisprudential works in the language. Indeed, Arabic was the major language for the works of the Hanafi school, which was the official Maddhab of the empire.

The Arabic newspaper Al Jawaib began in Constantinople, established by Fāris al-Shidyāq, a.k.a. Ahmed Faris Efendi. It published Ottoman laws in Arabic, including the Ottoman Constitution of 1876.

Several provincial newspapers (Ottoman Turkish: vilayet gazeteleri) were written in Arabic. The first Arabic language newspaper published in the Arab area of the empire was Ḥadīqat al-Akhbār, which Strauss has described as having a "semi-official" status. There was a French edition with the title Hadikat-el-Akhbar. Journal de Syrie et Liban. Others include the Tunis-based Al-Rāʾid at-Tūnisī and the bilingual Ottoman Turkish-Arabic paper in Iraq, Zevra/al-Zawrāʾ. According to Strauss, the latter had "the highest prestige, at least for a while" of the provincial Arabic newspapers.

During the Hamidian period, Arabic was promoted in the empire in the form of Pan-Islamist propaganda.

The Düstur was published in Arabic. Ziya Pasha wrote a satirical article about the difficulty of translating it into Arabic, suggesting that Ottoman Turkish needed to be changed to make governance easier.

In 1915, the Arabic-language university Al-Kuliyya al-Ṣalaḥiyya (Ottoman Turkish: Salahaddin-i Eyyubî Külliyye-i islamiyyesi) was established in Jerusalem.

=== Persian ===
Reprint of year three (January 1877-January 1878) of Akhtar ("The Star"), a newspaper in Persian

Persian was the language of the high court and literature between the 16th and 19th centuries.

The Persian-language paper Akhtar ("The Star") published Persian versions of Ottoman government documents, including the 1876 Constitution.

According to Strauss, Persian versions of the Takvim-i Vekayi may have existed.

== Non-Muslim minority languages ==
In 1861, the Greek language newspaper Anatolikos Astēr ("Eastern Star") was established. Konstantinos Photiadis was the editor in chief, and Demetrius Nicolaides served as an editor. In 1867, Nicolaides established his own Greek-language newspaper, Kōnstantinoupolis. According to Strauss, this "was long to remain the most widely read Greek paper in the Ottoman Empire." Nicolaides also edited Thrakē ("Thrace") and Avgi ("Aurora").

There was a bilingual Turkish-Greek version of Vekayi-i giridiyye (Greek: Κρητική Εφημερίς). The Edict of Gülhane and the Ottoman Reform Edict of 1856 were published in Greek.

The Düstur was published in Armenian, Bulgarian, Greek and Judaeo-Spanish (Ladino), as well as in Turkish using the Armenian alphabet. A version of the Düstur was also published in Karamanli Turkish. The Mecelle was also published in Greek, with Photiadis and Ioannis Vithynos as co-translators.

The Ottoman Constitution of 1876 was published in multiple non-Muslim languages, including Armenian, Bulgarian, Greek and Judeao-Spanish There was also a version in Turkish written in the Armenian alphabet.

Romanian was spoken in Dobruja, parts of Wallachia (Brăila, Giurgiu and Turnu Măgurele) and Moldavia (Budjak) annexed by the Ottoman Empire, the Danube shores, Yedisan (Transnistria) and the Temeşvar Eyalet. Megleno-Romanian was spoken in Moglena, while Aromanian was spoken all over the Balkans, but to the south of the Romanian-speaking regions.

When French-medium schools operated by Alliance Israelite Universelle opened in the 1860s, the position of Judaeo-Spanish began to weaken in the Ottoman Empire areas. This resulted in a rapid loss of the language in time periods after the end of the empire. Judaeo-Spanish was not used as a language of instruction in any time in history, and was instead acquired through families; therefore Hebrew was perceived as the ethnic instructional language for Jewish people, used for religious reasons, in the empire.

== Foreign languages ==
Beginning in the 1600s, many Christians took up certain educational professions as many Ottoman Muslims did not focus on foreign languages. Muslims began to focus more on foreign languages after the Greek War of Independence, in the 1800s, as they felt they could no longer rely on Greek dragomans.

=== Italian ===
Prior to the Tanzimat period, Italian, especially in its Venetian form, played a notable role as a medium of communication within the Ottoman Empire. Its use did not reflect any official status within the imperial administration; rather, it emerged from longstanding patterns of commercial interaction and maritime exchange linking Ottoman territories with Italian states, above all the Republic of Venice and the Republic of Genoa. In major port cities such as Constantinople and Smyrna, Italian functioned as a practical lingua franca among merchants, ship captains, and commercial agents, facilitating everyday transactions across linguistic boundaries. It was also widely employed by dragomans (interpreters), who relied on Italian as a working language in mediating between Ottoman officials and foreign representatives. While formal diplomatic instruments were typically issued in Ottoman Turkish, Italian frequently appeared in oral negotiations, preliminary exchanges, and intermediary documentation. Its role was therefore neither universal nor institutional, but it remained significant as a stable and widely understood medium of interaction in specific social and professional contexts tied to trade and diplomacy.

Turkish and European parties had used Latin for formal diplomatic purposes, though it had shifted towards Italian with the Treaty of Küçük Kaynarca.

=== French ===
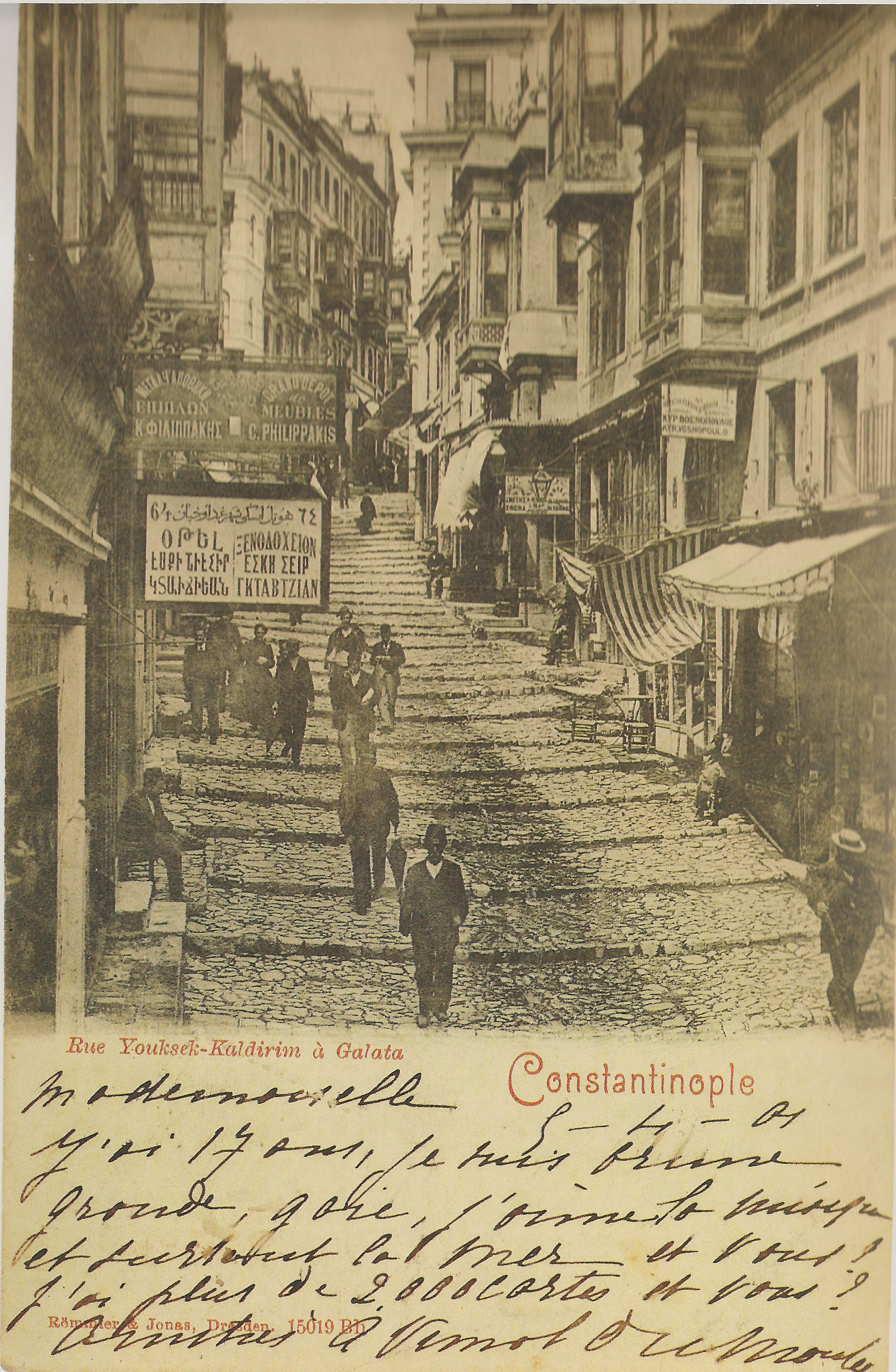
A 1901 postcard depicting Galata in Constantinople (Istanbul), showing signage in Ottoman Turkish, French, Greek, and Armenian

As Westernisation increased during and after the Tanzimat era, French in particular became more prominent due to its status as a major language of philosophy, diplomacy, and science. It was the sole common language of western European origin among all people with high levels of education from all ethnic groups, even though none of these groups used French as their native language. According to Bernard Lewis, author of The Muslim Discovery of Europe, the trend of French "seems" to have started with military training institutions hiring people who spoke French, and that other factors were the fact that the ministries of foreign affairs of Austria and Russia also used French, and the fact that the French government had increased interaction with the empire. Journal de Constantinople owner Gustave Courrier stated that French served as a mechanism "for an exchange of Eastern and Western knowledge".

In 1904, Lucy Mary Jane Garnett wrote that within Constantinople (Istanbul), "The generality of men, in official circles at least, speak French". Among the people using French as a lingua franca were Sephardic Jews, who adopted French as their primary language due to influence from the Alliance Israélite Universelle; this weakened the position of the Sephardic mother tongue, Judaeo-Spanish. Two factions opposing Sultan Abdul Hamid, the Ottoman Armenian and Young Turk groups, both used French.

According to Strauss, "In a way reminiscent of English in the contemporary world, French was almost omnipresent in the Ottoman lands." Strauss also stated that French was "a sort of semi-official language", which "to some extent" had "replaced Turkish as an 'official' language for non-Muslims". Strauss added that it "assumed some of the functions of Turkish and was even, in some respects, capable of replacing it." As part of the process, French became the dominant language of modern sciences in the empire.

Laws and official gazettes were published in French, aimed at diplomats and other foreign residents, with translation work done by employees of the Translation Office and other government agencies. The employees were nationals of the empire itself. Strauss states that as Ottoman officials wished to court the favour of people in Europe, "the French translations were in the eyes of some Ottoman statesmen the most important ones" and that due to the features of Ottoman Turkish, "without the French versions of these documents, the translation into the other languages would have encountered serious difficulties." Such translated laws include the Edict of Gülhane, the Ottoman Reform Edict of 1856, and the Ottoman Constitution of 1876. Strauss wrote that "one can safely assume that" the original drafts of the 1856 edict and some other laws were in French rather than Ottoman Turkish. Strauss also wrote that the Treaty of Paris of 1856 "seems to have been translated from the French." In particular versions of official documents in languages of non-Muslims such as the 1876 Constitution originated from the French translations. French was also officially the working language of the Ministry of Foreign Affairs in the period after the Crimean War.

In addition, newspapers written in other western European languages had editions in French or editions with portions in French. The cities of Constantinople, Beirut, Salonika (Thessaloniki) and Smyrna (İzmir) had domestically-published French-language newspapers. These newspapers were a part of the Francophone press in Turkey.

In 1827 Sultan Mahmud II announced that the empire's first medical school, the Imperial Military School of Medicine, would teach in French for the time being. A civil medical school also taught in French. By the 1860s advocates of French-language instruction and Ottoman Turkish–language instruction were engaged in a conflict; Turks advocated for Turkish while minoritarian groups and foreigners advocated for French. Spyridon Mavrogenis, employed in the imperial medical school as a professor, advocated for the usage of French. The empire later made Ottoman Turkish the language of the two medical schools. Another French-medium medical school was Beirut's Faculté Française de Médecine de Beyrouth. The Turkish-medium Şam Mekteb-i tıbbiyye-i mulkiyye-i şahane in Damascus acquired books written in French and enacted French proficiency tests. In 1880, a dual Ottoman Turkish and French-medium law school, Mekteb-i Hukuk, was established.

=== English ===
In 1904, Garnett wrote that many males of "official circles" within Constantinople "read, if they do not speak, English".

In regards to foreign languages in general, Garnett stated "in all large towns there are quite as many Turks who read and write some foreign language as would be found in a corresponding class in this country [meaning the United Kingdom]."

== Gallery ==
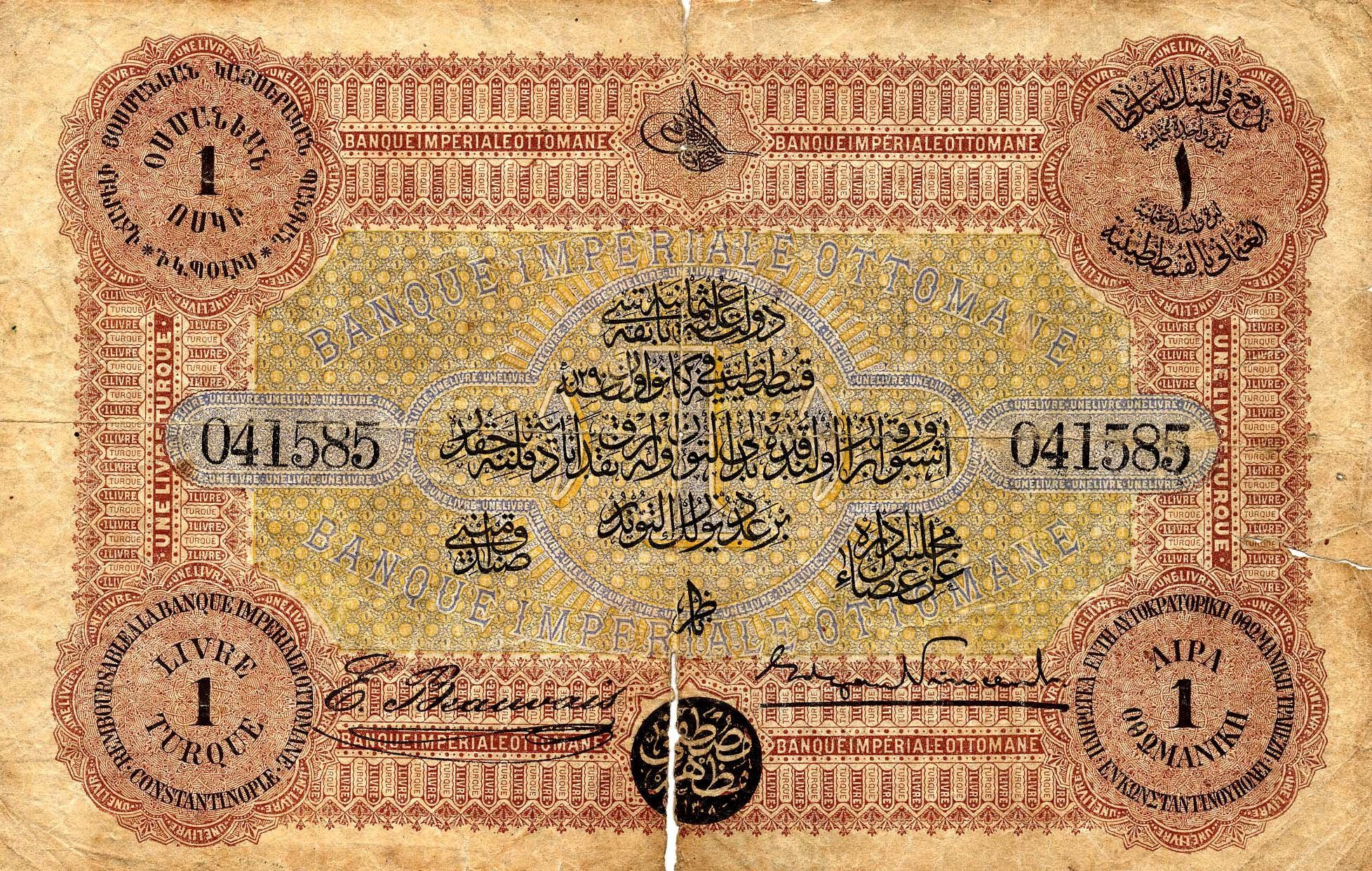
Ottoman lira note from 1880, denominated in five languages: Armenian, Arabic, Ottoman Turkish, French, and Greek

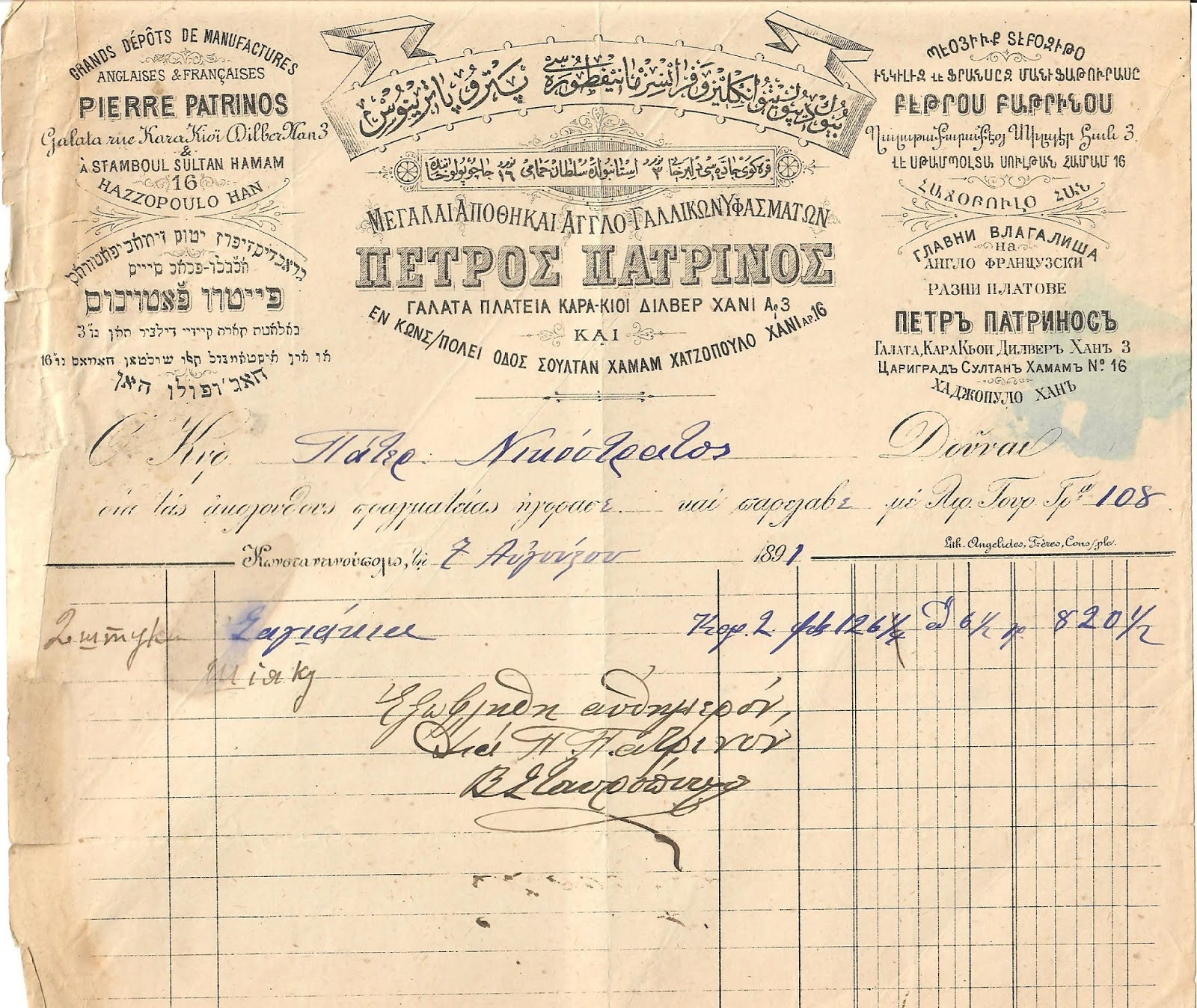
A fabric merchant's letterhead in six languages: French, Ottoman Turkish, Armenian, Ladino, Greek, and Bulgarian

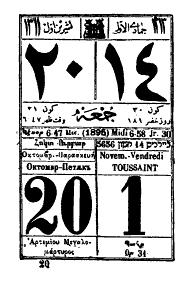
1896 calendar in Salonika (now Thessaloniki), a cosmopolitan city; the first three lines are in Ottoman script

== Sources ==
- Strauss, Johann (2010). "A Constitution for a Multilingual Empire: Translations of the Kanun-ı Esasi and Other Official Texts into Minority Languages". In Herzog, Christoph; Malek Sharif (eds.). The First Ottoman Experiment in Democracy. Wurzburg. pp. 21–51. (info page on book at Martin Luther University)
- Strauss, Johann (2016-07-07). "Language and power in the late Ottoman Empire". In Murphey, Rhoads (ed.). Imperial Lineages and Legacies in the Eastern Mediterranean: Recording the Imprint of Roman, Byzantine and Ottoman Rule. Routledge.
  - ISBN 9781317118459. Start: p. 115.
  - ISBN 9781317118442.
