= Vilayet Law =

Laws on how Ottoman vilayets (provinces) were to be governed

Law of the vilayets in Ottoman Turkish, published in Düstur series 1, Volume 1, Page 608

Law of the vilayets (French: loi des vilayets; 1867) in French, in Volume II of Legislation ottomane, published by Gregory Aristarchis and edited by Demetrius Nicolaides

The 1864 Vilayet Law (Ottoman Turkish: ولایت نظامنامه‌سی, Vilâyet Nizamnâmesi, French: Loi des Vilayets (Note: In languages of ethnic minorities: Greek: Νόμος των Βιλαετίων)), also known as the Provincial Reform Law, was introduced during the Tanzimat era of the late Ottoman Empire. This era of administration was marked by reform movements, with provincial movements led largely by Midhat Pasha, a key player in the Vilayet Law itself. The Vilayet Law reorganized the provinces within the empire, replacing the medieval eyalet system.

Its date of initial publication in the Gregorian calendar was 8 November 1864, and the Turkish date was 7 Cümadelahir (Djem. II) or Jumaada al-Akhir (Jumada al-Thani) 1281. The law was modified in 1867. The Ottoman Turkish version was first published in Takvim-i Vekayi No. 773, and was published in Düstur Volume I, pages 517–538, and the 1867 version was printed in the Düstur Volume I, pages 608–624. The Greek version was published in Оθωμανικοί Κώδηκες ("Othōmanikoi kōdēkes", meaning "Ottoman Codes", with Demotic Greek using "Οθωμανικοί κώδικες"), page 2911. The French version was published in Législation ottomane, published by Grégoire Aristarchi Bey, Volume II, page 273.

== Background ==
=== Eyalets ===
Eyalet map of the Ottoman Empire (1609)

Instituted by Murad I, the eyalet system divided the empire into provinces, beginning with Rumelia in the Balkans and Anatolia in Asia Minor. Eyalets were governed by a beylerbey, or "lord of lords." The eyalet contained subdivisions, called sanjaks.

== Vilayet ==
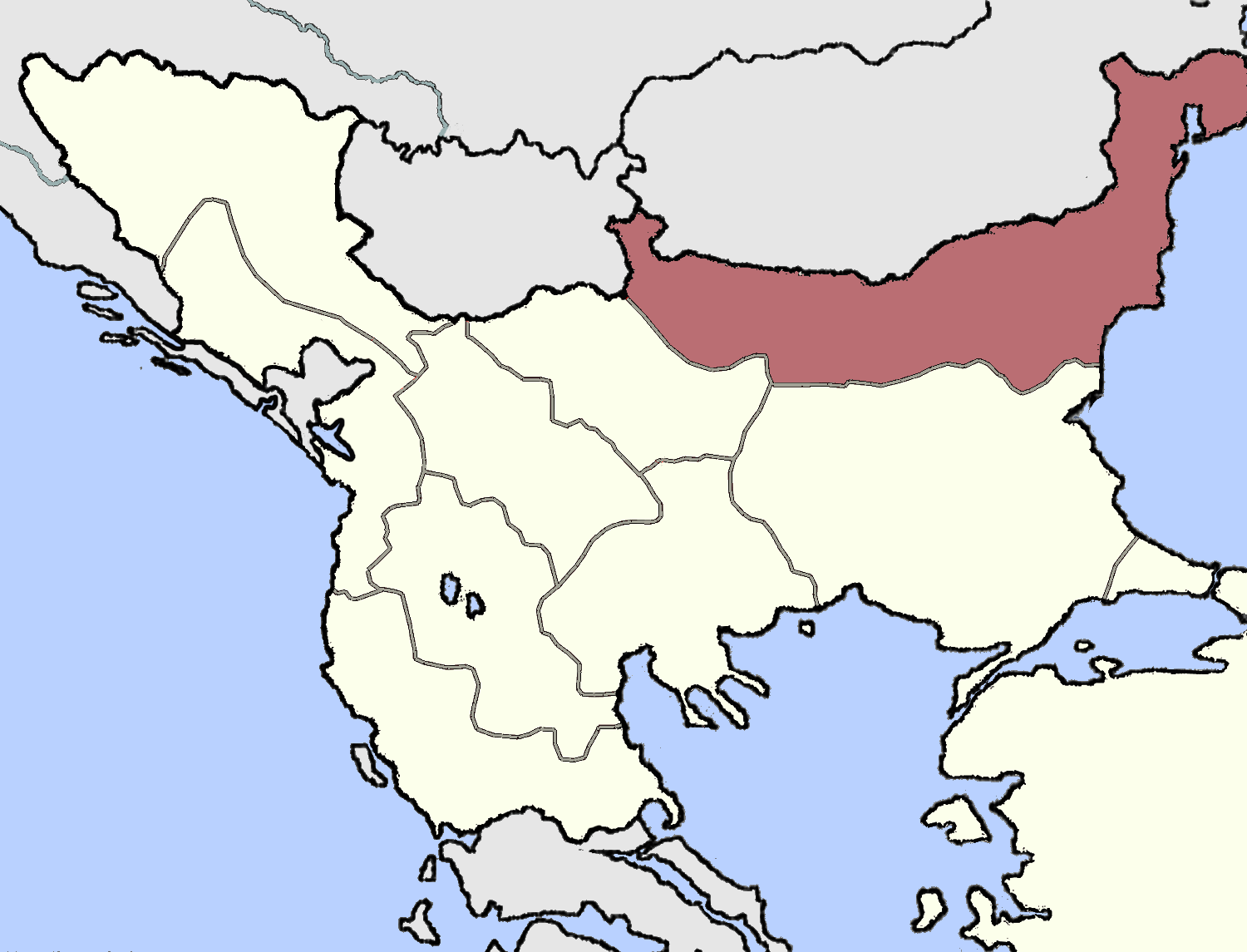
Danube Vilayet, Ottoman Balkans (1860s)

Considered by some to model closely after the French Prefect system, the new regulation subdivided the provinces of the empire into smaller subdivisions than the eyalet system had. Where the eyalet system had only sanjaks as subdivisions, the vilayet system included kazas (smaller administrative units), towns (kasaba), villages (karye) or village clusters (nahiye). Although the organizational titles were not created as a result of the Vilayet Law, the hierarchy in which they were set was.

=== Sanjak ===
Each vilayet was divided into numerous integral units. Within each sanjak was a city center. Furthermore, each sanjak contained smaller administrative units, called kazas. Sanjaks, as administrative units, had existed within the empire for centuries.

=== Kaza ===
The term kaza was originally used to designate areas of jurisdiction particular to each individual Islamic (Shari'a) court. The kaza, as an administrative unit, had existed within the empire since 1840. A particular and key feature of a kaza was that it was easy to reorganize at the discretion of the government: villages could be transferred between the existing kazas of a sanjak, while not necessarily eliminating a kaza in the process.

=== Administrative Offices ===
The Vilayet Law (Greek: Νόμος των Βιλαετίων) within the "Ottoman Codes" (Greek: Оθωμανικοί Κώδηκες "Othōmanikoi kōdēkes", with Demotic Greek using "Οθωμανικοί κώδικες"), the Greek version of the Düstur, edited by Demetrius Nicolaides

The Vilayet Law created a bureaucratic hierarchy within each province, with many of the upper-level offices appointed directly from Constantinople (now Istanbul). The list of upper-level, Ottoman government appointed officials is as follows:

- vali
- Overseer of the provincial justice system (müfettiş-i hukkâm or mufettichi-hukkiami-cherie
- Chief financial officer (muhasebeci)
- Director of correspondence (mektubcu)
- Director of real estate records (defter-i hakanî müdürü)

Lower-level officials appointed directly by the Ottoman government are as follows:

- Public works (nâfi’a)
- Landed agriculture (ziraat)
- Foreign affairs (umur-i ecnebiye)
- Census and cadastral surveys (tahrir-i emlâk)

Midhat Paşa, through his time as the vali of the Danube Vilayet came to institute other offices and institutions within the vilayet system. The list is as follows:

- Superintendent of the vocational schools for orphans and homeless children (Islahhaneler naziri)
- Director of telegraph works and stations (telegraf müfettişi)
- Chair of the Danube river navigation board (Idare-i nehriye) (An office specific to the Danube province)
- Chair of the Immigration Commission (Muhacirîn komisyonu)
- Director of the agricultural credit cooperatives (Menafi-i umumiye sandiklari)
- Registrar of the Statistical Commission (Divan-i istatistik)

The office of the governor had been reorganized into departments of civil, financial, police, political, and legal affairs. Officially, the governor had authority over all officials within the province, having held the highest office. However, the governor did not appoint sanjak and kaza officials, appointed directly by the sultan. Furthermore, the governor's authority is blurred when it comes to those officials who also reported to the respective ministries they served.

=== Administrative and Judicial Councils (meclis) ===
In addition to reorganizing the provincial government, the Vilayet Law also included the institution of councils as advisory boards to government officials. These councils were made up of both elected and appointed officials, seeking a balance between the people and the Ottoman government. Each council had its own specific and fixed proportion of elected to appointed officials.

The councils themselves were praised and mentioned by Ottoman statesmen as being the fulfillment of the promises made in the 1856 Hatt-i Hümayun for equal representation of both Muslim and non-Muslim members of the councils.

However, there existed problems with this framework; the equality applied only to elected members (âza-yi müntahabe) of the councils, not the entire membership of the councils. This "promise", was not applied systematically throughout the vilayet system. The administrative councils of the kaza level were exempt, having only three elected members of unspecified faith. Furthermore, the Muslims wound up maintaining the majority in most provinces when the appointed positions came up, as most appointed officials wound up being Muslim.

==== Administrative Councils (idare meclises) ====
The administrative councils served in an advisory capacity to the various provincial offices. Each provincial level (vilayet, sanjak, kaza, etc.) had its own advisory council. There were specific councils for the governor (vali), the kaymakams (sanjak governors), and the superintendents of the kazas. At the village level existed a Councils of Elders (Ihtiyar Meclisi) made up of entirely elected members with the purpose of advising the village headmen (muhtar).

The upper-level idare meclises acted as "control organs" for the decisions of the lower councils. For example, the Meclis-i Idare-i Vilayet routinely reviewed the decisions or resolutions passed by the sanjak and kaza level idare meclises.

==== Council Election Process ====
The council election process was highly elaborate and involved. While being closest to democratic on a village level, the process became much more stringently controlled by the government as upper-level elections took place.

At the village level, the enfranchised were males with "ties" to the village who were over 18 years of age, paying 50-plus piastres in direct yearly taxes. These men were able to elect headmen and those sitting on the Council of Elders for their specified village. To stand for office, a male had to be thirty years of age or older with "ties" to the locality, paying a sum of 100 piastres in direct yearly taxes. These elections were held yearly and had to be verified by the superintendent of the kaza.

At the kaza level, the elections were held every two years by an electoral commission. This commission was made up of the kaza müdürü, the kadi, the mufti, the imam, kaza scribes, and religious leaders of non-Muslim residents. The commission was charged with compiling a list of suitable candidates, 30 years of age or older who paid a sum of 150 piastres in direct yearly taxes and who were preferably literate. This list was then submitted to the Council of Elders, where about one-third of the candidates would be voted out. The list then passed for review to the kaymakam of the sanjak, where another third of the candidates would be eliminated. The remaining one-third of candidates made up the list of possible members.

This same process was repeated for the sanjak- and vilayet-level councils. Higher property qualifications existed for each successive level of the hierarchy.

This election process was to make the institutions "more amenable to state control under the guidance of appointed officials." Wherein some semblance of participation was allowed. Another more likely reason for this election system exists as well: to "ensure that the meclises would no longer be hijacked by narrow local interests," thus allowing the meclises to serve the vilayet as they should.

== Midhat Pasha ==
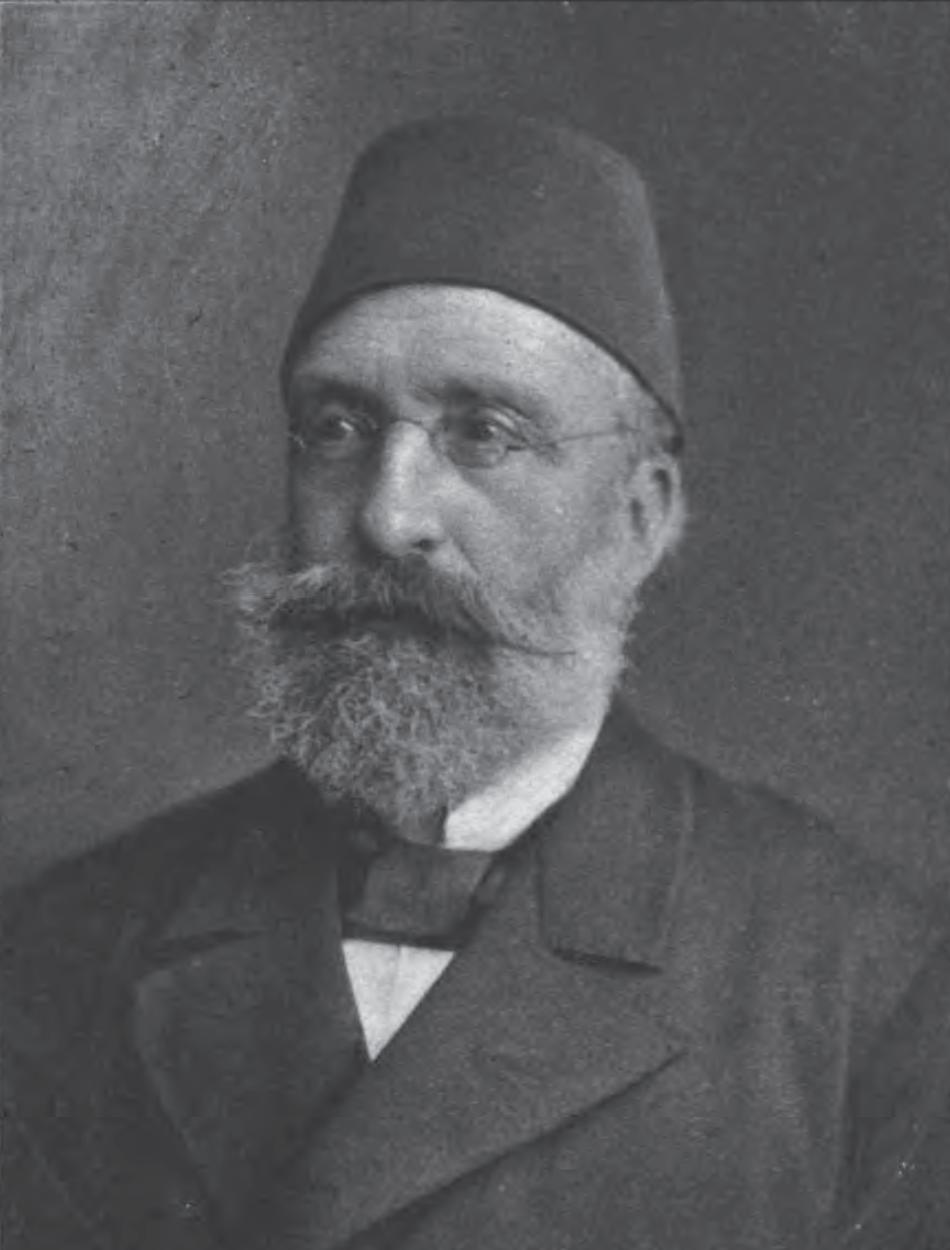
Midhat Pasha

Midhat Pasha presided as vali over the most successful of the vilayets, initially the Danube province and then five years later over the Baghdad area.

Midhat's successes have been attributed to his imaginativeness in governing and creating new offices and institutions, as well as his ability to heavily influence those directly appointed from Constantinople.

== Legacy ==
The Vilayet Law of 1864, although a strong reform movement in concept, has been seen as largely unsuccessful. That is not to say that there was failure in the division of offices and structure. It is to say that there was a failing in those appointed to the offices. Many officials were known to be incompetent, reluctant to leave Constantinople for a far-flung province, or susceptible to the existing political intrigue and struggle with the local notables (ayans) in the newly reorganized provinces.

== See also ==
- Vilayet
- Tanzimat
- Ottoman Empire
- Administrative divisions of the Ottoman Empire
