= Hatt-i Humayun =

Hatt-i Humayun may refer to:

- Hatt-i humayun, a handwritten note of an official nature by the Ottoman Sultan
- Hatt-i Humayun of 1856, also known as the "Reform Edict of 1856" (in Turkish: Islâhat Hatt-ı Hümâyûnu or Islâhat Fermânı )
