= Ottoman Reform Edict of 1856 =

1856 edict of the Ottoman government and part of the Tanzimat reforms

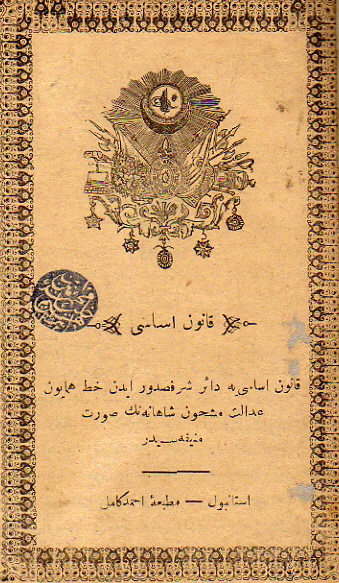
Ottoman constitution of 1876

French translation of the edict, in Législation ottomane Volume 2, written by François Belin

The Imperial Reform Edict (Ottoman Turkish: اصلاحات خط همايونى, Islâhat Hatt-ı Hümâyûnu; Modern Turkish: Islâhat Fermânı) was an 18 February 1856 edict of the Ottoman government and part of the Tanzimat reforms. The decree from Ottoman Sultan Abdulmejid I promised equality in education, government appointments, and administration of justice to all regardless of creed. The decree is often seen as a result of the influence of France and Britain, which assisted the Ottoman Empire against the Russians during the Crimean War (1853–1856) and the Treaty of Paris (1856) which ended the war.

Hatt-ı Hümayun was a promise by the Sultan to his citizens, subjects. The Sultan promised to be held responsible for the constitution of the "Provincial Councils" and "Communal Councils" and the fairness of this process and the results. In matters concerning all the subjects of the State (related with Hatt-ı Hümayun), the spiritual leader of every congregation, along with its official appointed for one year by the government, will participate in the negotiations of the Supreme Council of Judicial Ordinances, a law court established in 1837 to deal with cases of high officials. The sultan also promised freedom to vote in the councils.

These goals were promised by the sultan and emanated from his authority, indicating that the Hatt-ı Hümayun carried the authority of the Ottoman Sultanate itself, and was not a lower, bureaucratic reform.

== Content ==
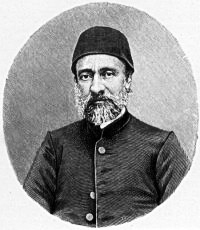
Mehmed Emin Âli Pasha, the principal architect of the Islâhat Fermânı.

Hatt-ı Hümayun "unites all the previous reforms" (beginning with Edict of Gülhane) and applies previous reform to all the subjects of the Empire, without distinction of class or religion, for the security of their persons and property and the preservation of their honor.

Hatt-ı Hümayun did not release the government from its previous obligations; spiritual immunities (Christian millets or other non-Muslim protectorates). Regarding these responsibilities review process established under each millet such that they form a commission composed ad hoc of members of its own body to give formulate (discuss) and submit the reforms required by the progress of Ottoman civilization.

=== Religion and civic duties ===
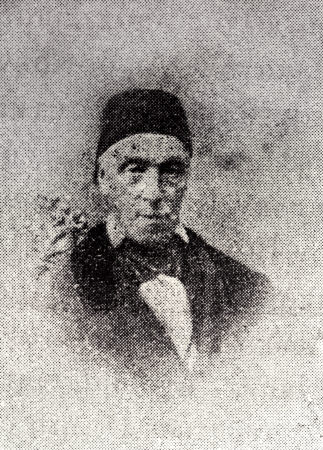
Stefanos Karatheodori Pasha (1789–1867) played a crucial role in enforcing equality in education, government appointments, and administration of justice.

Hatt-ı Hümayun granted that all forms of religion be freely worshiped, that no subject be hindered in the exercise of the religion, nor be in any way annoyed. It also granted that no one shall be compelled to change their religion.

Hatt-ı Hümayun brought accountability, such that the Patriarchs, Metropolitans, Archbishops, Bishops, and Rabbis began to take an oath on their entrance into office according to a form agreed upon (content of the oath is verified by the state), which they will be responsible for honoring their oath. In to build trust (prevent bribery); the income of these people (in public work) is replaced by fixed revenues of the Patriarchs and heads of communities, and by the allocation of allowances and salaries equitably proportioned to the importance, the rank, and the dignity of the different members of the clergy.

Hatt-ı Hümayun granted the full freedom of the repair, according to their original plan, of buildings set apart for religious worship, for schools, for hospitals, and for cemeteries; if these activities are performed at "non-mixed communities" under the towns, small boroughs and villages. To prevent the destruction of historical architectures, and keep track of public investments the plans of these different buildings, in case of their new erection, must, after having been approved by the Patriarchs or heads of communities, be submitted to Imperial order, or make known its observations upon them within a certain time.

Hatt-ı Hümayun granted that each community have equal power on the repair according to the original plan of the buildings for religious worship, schools, hospitals, and cemeteries; only if these activities are performed at "mixed communities" of the towns, small boroughs and villages. The authorities (decision making) in mixed populations use imperial system to pronounce a sovereign decision (imperial system visioned as a buffer).

Hatt-ı Hümayun granted the government the responsibility of the formation of roads and canals to increase the facilities of communication and the sources of the wealth.

Hatt-ı Hümayun granted the organization of new Code to determine how the works of public utility can be supported (raised from private and special taxes levied in the provinces). These funds could only be used to benefit of the establishment of ways of communication by land and sea.

=== Education ===
Hatt-ı Hümayun granted that all the subjects, without distinction, shall be received into the Civil and Military Schools. Every community is authorized to establish Public Schools of Science, Art, and Industry. However, in these public schools the methods of instruction and the choice of professors in schools of this class shall be under the control of a "Mixed Council of Public Instruction (Council of Public Instruction)" (Education ministry).

=== Justice ===
Hatt-ı Hümayun granted that all commercial, correctional, and criminal suits between Muslims and Christian or other non-Muslim subjects, or between Christians or other non-Muslims of different sects, shall be referred to "mixed tribunals". The proceedings were in public. The parties were confronted. Production of witnesses was granted which the testimonies were accepted upon an oath. Suits relating to civil affairs publicly tried. Civil affairs resolved before the Mixed Provincial Councils with the Governor and Judge.

Hatt-ı Hümayun granted that there will be formulation of the new Codes; penal, correctional, and commercial laws, and rules of procedure and they were translated and published in all the languages.

Hatt-ı Hümayun granted that the reform of the penitentiary (houses of detention, punishment, or correction) and other establishments. Activities had to reconcile the rights of humanity and with those of justice. Corporal punishment is abolished administered.

=== Public security ===
Hatt-ı Hümayun granted that police organization (policies and regulations) can not deny the guarantees for the safety of person and property. After the revision (defines a commission) officers are responsible. The police force was organized in capital, provincial towns and in the rural districts in separate organizations.

== Effect ==
Although the goal of the Hatt-ı Hümayun was to bring equality among Ottoman citizens, the process was perceived more as one intended to please Europe. The biggest change was the Ottoman State's acceptance of the notion of "minorities". Muslim government organizations (civil and military schools) began to accept non-Muslim citizens. The official state language principle (Ottoman Turkish for written communication) was broken, and the Empire became a multi-language system. Patriarchates began to administer justice on the state level, which could be said to weaken the judicial sovereignty of the State.

Some rules were cheered by non-Muslims:

- Non-Muslims could become civil servants,
- The possibility to transfer their inheritance cases to Patriarchates,
- The publishing of murder and commerce laws in the languages of the minorities,
- The establishment of higher court (judiciary) and the representation of all congregations with two representatives from each.
- The extending of powers of Patriarchates in administering justice,
- The extending of the right to property to foreigners.

Other rules were unpopular among non-Muslims:

- The obligation to do one's military service,
- The reexamination of religious privileges to make them equal (some millets lost privileges relative to others)
- The abolition of arbitrary fees exacted by priests all along from their congregations
- The establishment of salaries (fixed income) to spiritual leaders (priest, patriarch etc.)
- The obligation of spiritual leaders to take the oath of devotion

Hatt-ı Hümayun, in bringing equality among millet, created discontent in the Armenian Patriarchate. Before the Hatt-ı Hümayun, the Armenian Patriarch was not only the spiritual leader of the community, but its secular leader as well. The Armenians ("Armenian nationals") wanted to abolish oppression by the nobility, and draw up a new 'National Regulation', which limited the powers of Patriarch whose jurisdiction was extended to 50 regions and could at will dismiss the Bishops. Finally the Council accepted the draft regulation on 24 May 1860, and presented it to the Babiali. The Babiali ratified it with some minor changes, with a firman on 17 March 1863, and made it effective. In 1863 the Armenian National Constitution (Ottoman Turkish: نظامنامهٔ ملّت ارمنیان, romanized: Nizâmnâme-i Millet-i Ermeniyân) was Ottoman Empire approved form of the "Code of Regulations" composed of 150 articles drafted by the "Armenian intelligentsia", which defined the powers of Patriarch (position in Ottoman Millet) and newly formed "Armenian National Assembly". Armenian Patriarch with the sharing of his powers with the Armenian National Assembly and limitations brought by Armenian National Constitution perceived the changes as erosion of its community.

During the fall of the Ottoman Empire, foreign powers often influenced the government by means of foreign loans and aid as well as exploitation of the millet system and its groups of Jewish and Christian minorities.

== Translations ==
A Greek version translated by Z. Ypandrevmenos was published in Samos. The Ottoman authorities also had an official French translation, published in Le Moniteur ottoman and in the 1866 book De la juridiction française dans les échelles du Levant et de la Barbarie, by Féraud-Giraud. Fuad Pasha argued in favor of having this text translated into minority languages in the Empire, not only Ottoman Turkish and French. Johann Strauss, author of "A Constitution for a Multilingual Empire: Translations of the Kanun-ı Esasi and Other Official Texts into Minority Languages," wrote that "one can safely assume that" the original draft of the edict was in French rather than Ottoman Turkish.

French diplomat François Belin wrote his own French translation, with his own notes, which was published first in the Journal Asiatique and later in the 1862 published book Étude sur la propriété foncière en pays musulman et spécialement en Turquie. Belin's translation and notes were also published in another collection, Manuale di diritto publico e privato ottomano by Domenico Gatteschi. Belin's version was re-published in the French-language Ottoman law collection Législation ottomane, published by Gregory Aristarchis and edited by Demetrius Nicolaides.

A Greek translation of the edict made from the official Ottoman Empire French version, with several of Belin's notes included, appears in the Greek version of the Düstur (Greek: Оθωμανικοί Κώδηκες, romanized: Othōmanikoi kōdēkes, lit. 'Ottoman Codes'), compiled by Nicolaides, who included additional notes, including an 1860-issued berat in Greek, and removed some of Belin's notes; Johann Strauss argued that they were excised "probably because he considered them too critical".

== See also ==
- Tanzimât (تنظيمات) Fermânı. (3 November 1839)
- Tanzimât ( تنظيمات ) Era. (3 November 1839 – 22 November 1876)
- Regulation of the Armenian Nation (Turkish:"Nizâmnâme-i Millet-i Ermeniyân") (1863)
- Ten Conditions of Al-Ezabi
