= Konstantinoupolis =

Konstantinoupolis (Greek: Κωνσταντινούπολις, "Constantinople"), originally Heptalophos or Eptalofos (Ἑπτάλοφος, "City of Seven Hills"), was a Greek-language newspaper and periodical published in the Ottoman Empire.

The historian Johann Strauss wrote that Konstantinoupolis "was long to remain the most widely read Greek paper in the Ottoman Empire." An employee, Manuel Gedeon, stated that the style of the periodical was similar to that of Revue des Deux Mondes.

According to historians Evangelia Balta and Ayșe Kavak, Konstantinoupolis "went down in the history of the Istanbul press as setting the seal on [Ottoman Greek newspaper and legal code publisher Demetrius Nicolaides]'s career in journalism". They also wrote that its popularity was reflected by the long length of publication.

The newspaper was published daily for much of its history, though initially it was a thrice weekly publication.

== History ==
Eptalofos Nea

Ioannis M. Raptarchis owned a periodical named Heptalophos. Nicolaides became the editor in 1864, and in 1865 Raptarchis sold it to him. Initially Nicolaides renamed it Eptalofos Nea/Nea Eptalofos, with the first new issue in 15 January of that year.

Publication in a 25-centimetre (9.8 in) by 20-centimetre (7.9 in) newspaper format began in 1867, and after six months of newspaper publication it was given the name Konstantinoupolis. Publication as a periodical stopped in 1871.

At times the Ottoman authorities enacted censorship, so publication did not occur for circa 1883 until 1884.

As more and more Greeks adopted the Megali Idea, clashing with Nicolaides' Ottomanist beliefs, the readership decreased in the 1900s and 1910s. Nicolaides' son Nikolakis "Nikos" received the publication in June 1909 (mid-1327 in the Ottoman calendar) after their father asked the Ottoman Press office, in summer 1905 (start of Ottoman calendar 1326) to allow for a change of ownership as he was becoming elderly. Because Nicolaides tried to save the newspaper no matter what it took, he sold his possessions and lost his wealth. Balta and Kavak concluded, therefore, that the newspaper also caused "his financial ruin".

Publication stopped permanently in 1914, when World War I broke out.

== Contents ==
The Konstantinoupolis newspaper had political news and commentary for the first two pages, and letters to the editor and other news on the third page. Classifieds and announcements were on page four.

The Nea Eptalofos periodical version had three sections. The first was for literary and science articles, some Greek versions of content from European journals and some initially published in Nea Eptalofos. The second discussed ethnic Greek notable figures and home economics and other personal content. The third was dedicated to poetry and literary fiction, with some translations from European publications, as well as tourism-related content and content about the Byzantine Empire.

Nea Eptalofos included German studies of the Turks, including a glossary of terminology related to administration, Oghuz Turkish history, and where the Turkish people came from. Balta and Kavak stated that this was the first publication in the Greek language to have such content.

== Political stances ==
The newspaper favored the Rum Millet, the Ecumenical Patriarchate of Constantinople, and Joachim III. Balta and Kavak stated that it had a "moderate stance" in regards to the "Bulgarian Question". The editors opposed illegal activity.

== Publishing ==
The Eptalofos publishers published the Greek version of the Düstur, Ὀθωμανικοὶ Κώδηκες ("Othōmanikoi kōdēkes", meaning "Ottoman Codes", with Demotic Greek using "Οθωμανικοί Κώδικες"). In addition they published versions of Aeneid and The Iliad.

== Access ==
Libraries and archives with copies of the paper include the website of the Hellenic Parliament Library, the National Library of Greece, and other such facilities in Athens.

== See also ==
- Servet - A newspaper in Ottoman Turkish published by Nicolaides
- Législation ottomane - A collection of Ottoman laws in French edited by Nicolaides
- Media of the Ottoman Empire
