= Constitution of the Ottoman Empire =

First constitution of the Ottoman Empire

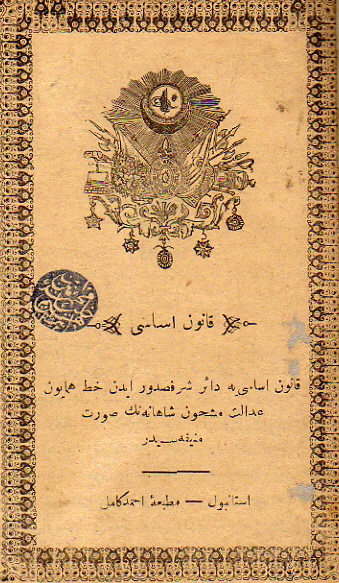
Cover of the Ottoman constitution of 1876

The Constitution of the Ottoman Empire (Ottoman Turkish: قانون أساسي, romanized: Kānûn-ı Esâsî, lit. 'Basic law'; French: Constitution ottomane) was in effect from 1876 to 1878 in a period known as the First Constitutional Era, and from 1908 to 1922 in the Second Constitutional Era. The first and only constitution of the Ottoman Empire, it was written by members of the Young Ottomans, particularly Midhat Pasha, during the reign of Sultan Abdul Hamid II (r. 1876–1909). After Abdul Hamid's political downfall in the 31 March Incident, the Constitution was amended to transfer more power from the sultan and the appointed Senate to the popularly-elected lower house: the Chamber of Deputies.

In the course of their studies in Europe, some members of the new Ottoman elite concluded that the secret of Europe's success rested not only with its technical achievements but also with its political organizations. Moreover, the process of reform itself had imbued a small segment of the elite with the belief that constitutional government would be a desirable check on autocracy and provide it with a better opportunity to influence policy. Sultan Abdulaziz's chaotic rule led to his deposition in 1876 and, after a few troubled months, to the proclamation of an Ottoman constitution that the new sultan, Abdul Hamid II, pledged to uphold.

== Background ==
The Ottoman Constitution was introduced after a series of reforms were promulgated in 1839 during the Tanzimat era. The goal of the Tanzimat era was to reform the Ottoman Empire under the auspices of Westernization. In the context of the reforms, Western-educated Armenians of the Ottoman Empire drafted the Armenian National Constitution in 1863. The Ottoman Constitution of 1876 was under direct influence of the Armenian National Constitution and its authors. The Ottoman Constitution of 1876 itself was drawn up by Western-educated Ottoman Armenian Krikor Odian, who was the advisor of Midhat Pasha.

Attempts at reform within the empire had long been made. Under the reign of Sultan Selim III, there was a vision of actual reform. Selim tried to address the military's failure to effectively function in battle; even the basics of fighting were lacking, and military leaders lacked the ability to command. Eventually his efforts led to his assassination by the Janissaries. This action soon led to Mahmud II becoming Sultan. Mahmud can be considered the "first real Ottoman reformer", since he took a substantive stand against the janissaries by removing them as an obstacle in the Auspicious Incident.

This led to what was known as the Tanzimat, which lasted from 1839 to 1876. This era was defined as an effort of reform to distribute power from the Sultan (even trying to remove his efforts) to the newly formed government led by a parliament. These were the intentions of the Sublime Porte, which included the newly formed government. The purpose of the Tanzimat era was reform, but mainly, to divert power from the Sultan to the Sublime Porte. The first indefinable act of the Tanzimat period was when Sultan Abdülmecid I issued the Edict of Gülhane. This document or statement expressed the principles that the liberal statesmen wanted to become an actual reality. The Tanzimat politicians wanted to prevent the empire from falling completely into ruin.

During this time the Tanzimat had three different sultans: Abdülmecid I (1839–1861), Abdülaziz (1861–1876), and Murad V (who only lasted three months in 1876). During the Tanzimat period, the man from the Ottoman Empire with the most respect in Europe was Midhat Pasha. Midhat dreamed of an Empire in which "there would be neither Muslim nor non-Muslim but only Ottomans". Such ideology led to the formation of groups such as the Young Ottomans and the Committee of Union and Progress (who merged with the Ottoman Unity Society). These movements attempted to bring about real reform not by means of edicts and promises, but by concrete action. Even after Abdulhamid II suspended the constitution, it was still printed in the salname, or yearbooks made by the Ottoman government.

Johann Strauss, author of "A Constitution for a Multilingual Empire: Translations of the Kanun-ı Esasi and Other Official Texts into Minority Languages", wrote that the Constitution of Belgium and the Constitution of Prussia (1850) "seem to have influenced the Ottoman Constitution".

== Aim ==
An English translation of the Constitution, derived from the French version, published in The American Journal of International Law

The Ottoman Porte believed that once the Christian population was represented in the legislative assembly, no foreign power could legitimize the promotion of her national interests under pretext of representing the rights of these people on religious and ethnic bonds. In particular, if successfully implemented, it was thought that it would rob Russia of any such claims. However, its potential was never realized and the tensions with the Russian Empire culminated in the Russo-Turkish War (1877–1878).

== Framework ==
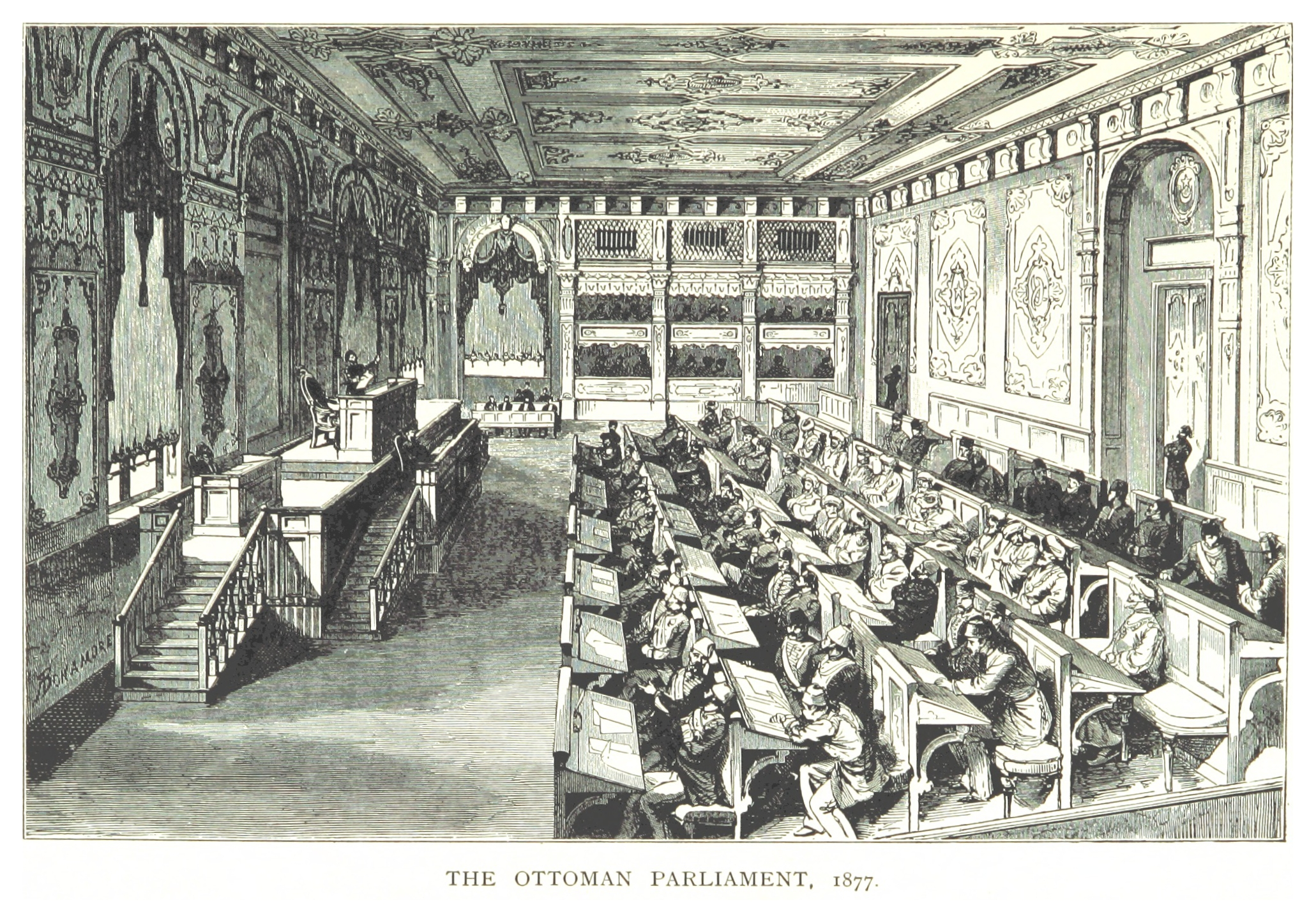
Meeting of the first Ottoman Parliament in 1877

After Sultan Murad V was removed from office, Abdul Hamid II became the new Sultan. Midhat Pasha was afraid that Abdul Hamid II would go against his progressive visions; consequently he had an interview with him to assess his personality and to determine if he was on board. The Constitution proposed a bicameral parliament, the General Assembly, consisting of the Sultan-selected Senate and the generally elected Chamber of Deputies (although not directly; the populace chose delegates who would then choose the Deputies). There were also elections held every four years to keep the parliament changing and to continually express the voice of the people. This same framework carried over from the Constitution as it was in 1876 until it was reinstated in 1908. Ultimately, the framework on the Constitution did little to limit the Sultan's power. Some of the retained powers of the Sultan were: declaration of war, appointment of new ministers, and approval of legislation.

== Implementation ==
Although talks about the implementation of a constitution were in place during the rule of Murad V, they did not come to fruition. A secret meeting between Midhat Pasha, the main author of the constitution, and Abdul Hamid II, the brother of the sultan, was arranged in which it was agreed that a constitution would be drafted and promulgated immediately after Abdul Hamid II came to the throne. Following this agreement, Murat V was deposed on 1876 by a fetva on the grounds of insanity. A committee of 24 (later 28) people, led by Midhat Pasha, was formed to work on the new constitution. They submitted the first draft on 13 November 1876 which was obstreperously rejected by Abdul Hamid II's ministers on the grounds of the abolishment of the office of the Sadrazam. After strenuous debates, a constitution acceptable to all sides was established and the constitution was signed by Abdul Hamid II on the morning of December 13, 1876.

=== Language versions ===
According to Strauss, the authorities seemed to have had prepared multiple language versions of the constitution at the same time prior to release as their publication year was 1876: he stated that such release "apparently occurred simultaneously". They were officially published in various newspapers, owned by their respective publishers, according to language, and there were other publications that re-printed them.

Strauss divides the translations into "Oriental-style" versions - ones made for adherents of Islam, and "Western-style" versions - ones made for Christian and Jewish people, including Ottoman citizens and foreigners residing in the empire.

==== Versions for Muslims ====
The version in Ottoman Turkish was used as the basis of translations of versions for Muslims, in Arabic and Persian

The constitution was originally made in Ottoman Turkish with a Perso-Arabic script. The Ottoman government printed it, as did printing presses from private individuals.

There are a total of ten Turkish terms, and the document instead relies on words from Arabic, which Strauss argues is "excessive". In addition, he stated that other defining aspects include "convoluted sentences typical of Ottoman chancery style", izafet, and a "deferential indirect style" using honorifics. Therefore Strauss wrote that due to its complexity, "A satisfactory translation into Western languages is difficult, if not impossible." Max Bilal Heidelberger wrote a direct translation of the Ottoman Turkish version and published it in a book chapter by Tilmann J Röder, "The Separation of Powers: Historical and Comparative Perspectives."

A Latin script rendition of the Ottoman Turkish appeared in 1957, in the Republic of Turkey, in Sened-i İttifaktan Günümüze Türk Anayasa Metinleri, edited by Suna Kili and A. Şeref Gözübüyük and published by Türkiye İş Bankası Kültür Yayınları.

In addition to the original Ottoman Turkish, the document had been translated into Arabic and Persian. Language versions for Muslims were derived from the Ottoman Turkish version, and Strauss wrote that the vocabularies of the Ottoman Turkish, Arabic, and Persian versions were "almost identical". Despite the Western concepts in the Ottoman Constitution, Strauss stated that "The official French version does not give the impression that the Ottoman text is a translation of it."

The Arabic version was published in Al-Jawā ́ ib. Strauss, who also wrote "Language and power in the late Ottoman Empire," stated that the terminology used in the Arabic version "stuck almost slavishly" to that of the Ottoman Turkish, with Arabic itself "almost exclusively" being the source of the terminology; as newer Arabic words were replacing older ones used by Ottoman Turkish, Strauss argued that this closeness "is more surprising" compared to the closeness of the Persian version to the Ottoman original, and that the deliberate closeness to the "Ottoman text is significant, but it is difficult to find a satisfactory explanation for this practice."

From 17 January 1877 a Persian version appeared in Akhtar. Strauss stated that the closeness of the Persian text to the Ottoman original was not very surprising as Persian adopted Arabic-origin Ottoman Turkish words related to politics.

==== Versions for non-Muslim minorities ====
This version in French was used as the basis for translations into languages used by Christian and Jewish minorities and into English (printed in Législation ottomane Volume 5)

Versions for non-Muslims included those in Armenian, Bulgarian, Greek, and Judaeo-Spanish (Ladino). There was also a version in Armeno-Turkish, Turkish written in the Armenian alphabet. These versions were respectively printed in Masis, Makikat, Vyzantis, De Castro Press, and La Turquie.

Strauss stated that versions for languages used by non-Muslims were based on the French version, being the "model and the source of the terminology". Strauss pointed to the fact that honorifics and other linguistic features in Ottoman Turkish were usually not present in these versions. In addition each language version has language-specific terminology that is used in place of some terms from Ottoman Turkish. Different versions either heavily used foreign terminology or used their own languages' terminologies heavily but they generally avoided using the Ottoman Turkish one; some common French-derived Ottoman terms were replaced with other words. Based on the differences between the versions for non-Muslims and the Ottoman Turkish version, Strauss concluded that "foreign influences and national traditions – or even aspirations" shaped the non-Muslim versions, and that they "reflect religious, ideological and other divisions existing in the Ottoman Empire."

Since the Armenian version, which Strauss describes as "puristic", uses Ottoman terminology not found in the French version and on some occasions in lieu of native Armenian terms, Strauss described it as having "taken into account the Ottoman text". The publication Bazmavep ("Polyhistore") re-printed the Armenian version.

The Bulgarian version was re-printed in four other newspapers: Dunav/Tuna, Iztočno Vreme, Napredŭk or Napredǎk ("Progress") and Zornitsa ("Morning Star"). Strauss wrote that the Bulgarian version "corresponds exactly to the French version"; the title page of the copy in the collection of Christo S. Arnaudov (Bulgarian: Христо С. Арнаудовъ; Post-1945 spelling: Христо С. Арнаудов) stated that the work was translated from Ottoman Turkish, but Strauss said this is not the case.

Strauss stated that the Greek version "follows the French translation" while adding Ottoman synonyms of Greek terminology and Greek synonyms of Ottoman terminology.

Strauss wrote that "perhaps the Judaeo-Spanish – version may have been checked against the original Ottoman text".

Strauss also wrote "There must have also been a Serbian version available in [Bosnia Vilayet]". Arsenije Zdravković published a Serbian translation after the Young Turk Revolution.

==== Versions for foreigners ====
There were versions made in French and English. The former was intended for diplomats and was created by the Translation Office (Terceme odası). Strauss stated that a draft copy of the French version had not been located and there is no evidence that states that one had ever been made. The French version has some terminology originating from Ottoman Turkish.

A 1908 issue of the American Journal of International Law printed an Ottoman-produced English version but did not specify its origin. After analysing a passage from it, Strauss concluded "Clearly, the “contemporary English version” was also translated from the French version." (Note: For a scientific English translation directly from the Ottoman Turkish version of the constitution, done by Max Bilal Heidelberger, see below. It originates from the copy published in the Düstūr (Ottoman Official Gazette) 1st series (tertïb-i evvel), Volume 4, Pages 4-20. Röder, Tilmann J. (2012-01-11). "The Separation of Powers: Historical and Comparative Perspectives". In Grote, Rainer; Tilmann J. Röder (eds.). Constitutionalism in Islamic Countries. Oxford University Press USA. pp. 321-372. ISBN 9780199759880. - Old ISBN 019975988X The article includes the following documents in "Annex: Constitutional Documents from the Ottoman and Iranian Empires": "The Basic Law [Kanūn-ı Esāsī] of the Ottoman Empire of December 23, 1876"; p. 341-352; "B. Revisions of the Basic Law" - Start p. 352: Law No. 130 on the Revision of Some Articles of the Basic Law of 7th Zi’lhijjeh 1293 (5th Sha’ban 1327 / August 8, 1909); Law No. 318 Revising the Articles 7, 35, and 43 Revised on 5th Sha’ban 1327 (2nd Rejeb 1332 – May 15, 1914); Law No. 80 Revising the Article 102 of the Basic Law of the 7th Zi’lhijjeh 1293 and the Articles 7 and 43 Revised on 2nd Rejeb 1332 (26th Rebi’ü-’l-Evvel 1333 – January 29, 1914); Law No. 307 Revising the Revision of Article 76 of 5th Sha’ban 1327 (4th Jumada-‘l-Ula 1334 – February 25, 1916); Law on the Revision of the Revised Art. 7 of the Basic Law of 26th Rebi’ü-’l-Evvel 1333 and the Deletion of the Revised Art. 35 of 2nd Rejeb 1332 (4th Jumada-‘l-Ula 1334 – February 25, 1916); Law No. 370 Revising Article 72 of the Basic Law of 7th Zi’lhijjeh 1293 (15th Jumada-‘l-Ula 1334 – March 7, 1916); Law No 102 Revising Art. 69 of the Basic Law (8th Jumada-‘l-Ula 1334 – March 21, 1918).; The translation in Constitutionalism in Islamic Countries does not include the edict of Abdulhamid II to Midhat Pasha, which was from Düstūr 1st Series, Volume 4, Pages 2-3.)

Strauss wrote "I have not come across a Russian translation of the Kanun-i esasi. But it is highly probable that it existed."

=== Terminology ===
Versions in several languages for Christians and Jews used variants of the word "constitution": konstitutsiya in Bulgarian, σύνταγμα (syntagma) in Greek, konstitusyon in Judaeo-Spanish, and ustav in Serbian. The Bulgarian version used a term in Russian, the Greek version used a calque from the French word "constitution", the Judaeo-Spanish derived its term from the French, and the Serbian version used a word from Slavonic. The Armenian version uses the word sahmanadrut‘iwn (Western Armenian: սահմանադրութիւն).

Those in Ottoman Turkish, Arabic, and Persian used a word meaning "basic law", Kanun-i esasi in Turkish, al-qānūn al-asāsī in Arabic, and qānūn-e asāsī in Persian. Strauss stated that the Perso-Arabic term is closer in meaning to "Grundgesetz".

== European influence ==
As European power increased over the 18th century, the Ottomans saw a lack of progress themselves. In the Treaty of Paris (1856), the Ottomans were now considered part of the European world. This was the beginning of intervention by Europeans (i.e. the United Kingdom and France) in the Ottoman Empire. One of the reasons they were taking a step into Ottoman territory was for the protection of Christianity in the Ottoman Empire. There had been perennial conflict between Muslims and non-Muslims in the Empire. This was the focal point for the Russians to interfere, and the Russians were perhaps the Ottomans' most disliked enemy. The Russians looked for many ways to become involved in political affairs especially when unrest in the Empire reached their borders. The history of the Russo-Turkish wars was long, for many different reasons. The Ottomans saw the Russians as their most fierce enemy and not one to be trusted.

== Domestic and foreign reactions ==
Reactions within the Empire and around Europe were both widely acceptable and potentially a cause for some concern. Before the Constitution was enacted and made official, many of the Ulema were against it because they deemed it to be going against the Shari'a. However, throughout the Ottoman Empire, the people were extremely happy and looking forward to life under this new regime. Many people celebrated and joined in Muslim-Christian relations which formed, and there now seemed to be a new national identity: Ottoman. However many provinces and people within the Empire were against it and many acted out their displeasure in violence. Some Muslims agreed with the Ulema that the constitution violated Shari'a law. Some acted out their protests by attacking a priest during mass. Some of the provinces referred to in the constitution were alarmed, such as Rumania, Scutari and Albania, because they thought it referred to them having a different change of government or no longer being autonomous from the Empire.

Yet the most important reaction, only second to that of the people, was that of the Europeans. Their reactions were quite to the contrary from the people; in fact they were completely against it—so much so that the United Kingdom was against supporting the Sublime Porte and criticized their actions as reckless. Many across European saw this constitution as unfit or a last attempt to save the Empire. In fact only two small nations were in favor of the constitution but only because they disliked the Russians as well. Others considered the Ottomans to be grasping for straws in trying to save the Empire; they also labeled it as a fluke of the Sublime Porte and the Sultan.

== Initial suspension of the constitution ==
After the Ottomans were defeated in the Russo-Turkish War (1877–1878) a truce was signed on 31 January 1878 in Edirne. Fourteen days after this event, on February 14, 1878, Abdul Hamid II took the opportunity to prorogue the parliament, citing social unrest. This allowed him to avoid new elections. Abdul Hamid II, increasingly withdrawn from society to the Yıldız Palace, was therefore able rule the most part of three decades in an absolutist manner.

== Second Constitutional Era ==
The Constitution was put back into effect in 1908 as Abdul Hamid II came under pressure, particularly from some of his military leaders. Abdul Hamid II's fall came as a result of the 1908 Young Turk Revolution, and the Young Turks put the 1876 constitution back into effect. The second constitutional period spanned from 1908 until after World War I when the Ottoman Empire was dissolved. Many political groups and parties were formed during this period, including the Committee of Union and Progress (CUP).

== Final Suspension of the Constitution ==
On 20 January 1920, the Grand National Assembly met and ratified the Turkish Constitution of 1921. However, since this document did not clearly state whether the Ottoman Constitution of 1876 was superseded, consequentially, only provisions contradictory to the 1921 Constitution became null and void (lex posterior derogat legi priori). The rest of the constitution resumed its implementation up until 20 April 1924, when both the Constitutions of 1876 and 1921 were replaced by an entirely new document, the Constitution of 1924.

== Significance of the constitution ==
The Ottoman Constitution made all subjects Ottomans under the law. By doing so, everyone, regardless of their religion had the right to liberties such as freedom of press and free education. Despite the latitude it gave to the sovereign, the constitution provided clear evidence of the extent to which European influences operated among a section of the Ottoman bureaucracy. This showed the effects of the pressure from Europeans on the issue of discrimination of religious minorities within the Ottoman Empire, although, Islam was still the recognized religion of the state. The constitution also reaffirmed the equality of all Ottoman subjects, including their right to serve in the new Chamber of Deputies. The constitution was more than a political document; it was a proclamation of Ottomanism and Ottoman patriotism, and it was an assertion that the empire was capable of resolving its problems and that it had the right to remain intact as it then existed. It officially established the subjects of the Empire as "Ottomans," with the Sultan being titled "Padishah and Sovereign of all Ottomans," rather than "of the Turks." The Ottoman Constitution of 1876 was preceded by the Nationality Law of 1869, which created a common and equal citizenship for all Ottomans, regardless of race or religion. The constitution built upon those ideas and expanded on them, well focusing on keep the state together.

Ultimately, although the constitution created an elected chamber of deputies and an appointed senate, it only placed minimal restriction on the Sultan's power. Under the constitution, the Sultan retained the power to declare war and make peace, to appoint and dismiss ministers, to approve legislation, and to convene and dismiss the chamber of deputies. The sultan remained the theocratic legitimized sovereign to which the state organization was made-to-measure. Thus, despite a de jure intact constitution, the sultan ruled in the absolutist manner. This was particularly evident in the closure of Parliament only eleven months after the declaration of the Constitution. Although the basic rights guaranteed in the constitution were not at all insignificant in Ottoman legal history, they were severely limited by the pronouncements of the ruler. Instead of overcoming sectarian divisions through the institution of universal representation, the elections reinforced the communitarian basis of society by allotting quotas to the various religious communities based on projections of population figures derived from the census of 1844. Furthermore, in order to appease the European powers, the Ottoman administration drafted an exceedingly uneven representational scheme that favored the European provinces by an average 2:1 ratio.

== See also ==
- Ottoman law
- General Assembly of the Ottoman Empire
- Constitution of Turkey
