= Hatt-i humayun =

Written order from an Ottoman Sultan

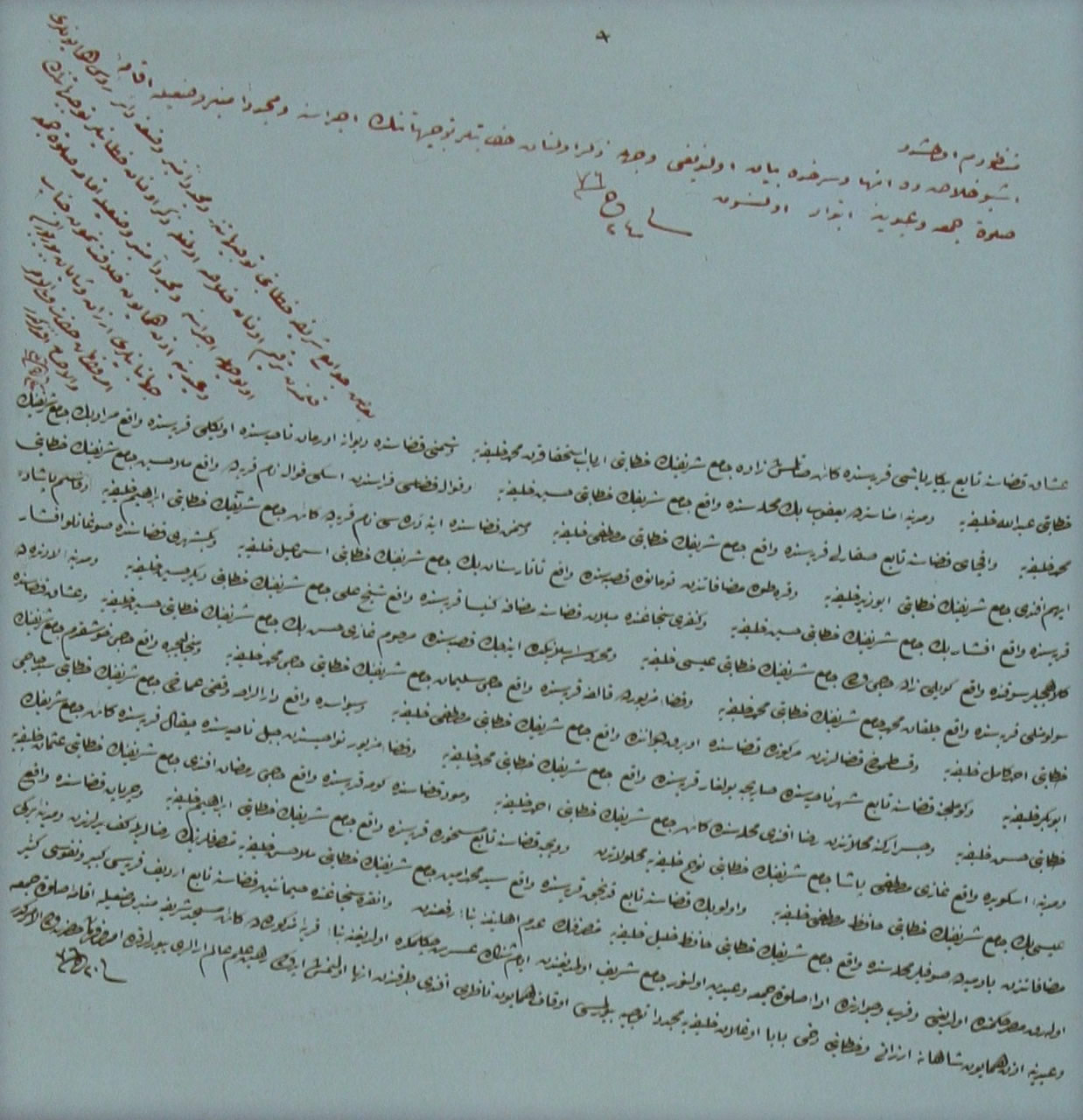
Sultan Abdulmecid's hatt-i humayun (written in red, horizontally, on top) on a memorandum (in black, below) about certain mosques needing to be repaired. The red handwriting in diagonal is a summary by the grand vizier of the original memorandum. The sultan writes: "I have been informed. Those structures mentioned in this summary are to be rebuilt expeditiously for Jum'ah and Bayram prayers."

Hatt-i humayun (Ottoman Turkish: خط همايون ḫaṭṭ-ı hümayun, plural خط همايونلر, ḫaṭṭ-ı hümayunlar), also known as hatt-i sharif (خط شریف ḫaṭṭ-ı şerîf, plural خط شریفلر, ḫaṭṭ-ı şerîfler), was the diplomatics term for a document or handwritten note of an official nature composed and personally signed by an Ottoman sultan. These notes were commonly written by the sultan personally, although they could also be transcribed by a palace scribe. They were written usually in response to, and directly on, a document submitted to the sultan by the grand vizier or another officer of the Ottoman government. Thus, they could be approvals or denials of a letter of petition, acknowledgements of a report, grants of permission for a request, an annotation to a decree, or other government documents. Hatt-i humayunlar could also be composed from scratch, rather than as a response to an existing document.

After the Tanzimat era (1839–1876), aimed at modernizing the Ottoman Empire, hatt-i humayuns of the routine kind, as well as fermans, were supplanted by the practice of irade-i seniyye, or irade (Ottoman Turkish: اراده سنیه irâde-i seniyye; French: iradé or less standardly iradèh, meaning 'ordinance' (Note: In languages of ethnic minorities: Armenian: kayserakan hramanagr; Bulgarian: Imperatorskyi Ukaz.; Greek: Αυτοκρατορικού Ιραδέ (Avtokratorikou Iradé); Ladino: irade imperial)), in which the sultan's spoken response to his Grand Vizier's recommendations was recorded on the document by his scribe.

There are nearly 100,000 hatt-i humayunlar in the Ottoman archives in Istanbul. Among the more famous are the Hatt-i Sharif of Gulhane (Ottoman Turkish: خط شریف گلخانه, also known as the Tanzimat Fermani [تنظیمات فرمانی]) of 1839 and the Imperial Reform Edict (اصلاحات خط همايونى) of 1856. The first one, which opened the Tanzimat era, is so called because it carries a handwritten order by the sultan to the grand vizier to execute his command.

The term hatt-i humayun can sometimes also be used in a literal sense, meaning a document handwritten by an Ottoman sultan.

== Etymology ==
The terms hatt-i humayun and hatt-i sharif are ezafe constructions of خط ḫaṭṭ (Modern Turkish: hat, from Arabic خَطّ khaṭṭ, 'handwriting, command') and همایون hümayun (Modern Turkish: hümayun, from Persian همایون homâyun, 'imperial') or شریف şerîf (Modern Turkish: şerif, from Arabic شَريف sharīf, 'lofty, noble').

The term irade-i seniyye is an ezafe of Arabic إرادة ʾirāda and سَنِيّة saniyya, the feminine of سَنِيّ saniyy. Around the late Ottoman Empire, the word irade was often used in European publications, but by the 21st century it became disused in European languages:

- Bulgarian: ираде́, romanized: iradé
- English: irade
- French: iradé
- German: Irade
- Greek: ιραδές, romanized: iradés
- Italian: iradè
- Macedonian: ираде, romanized: irade
- Romanian: iradea
- Russian: ираде́, romanized: iradé

== Types of hatt-ı hümayun ==
The hatt-ı hümayun would usually be written to the grand vizier (Sadrazam), or in his absence, to his replacement (the ka'immakâm), or to another senior official such as the grand admiral (Kapudan-i Derya) or the governor-general (Beylerbey) of Rumeli. There were three types of hatt-ı hümayuns:

- those addressed to a government post
- those "on the white"
- those on a document

=== Hatt-ı hümayun to a government post ===
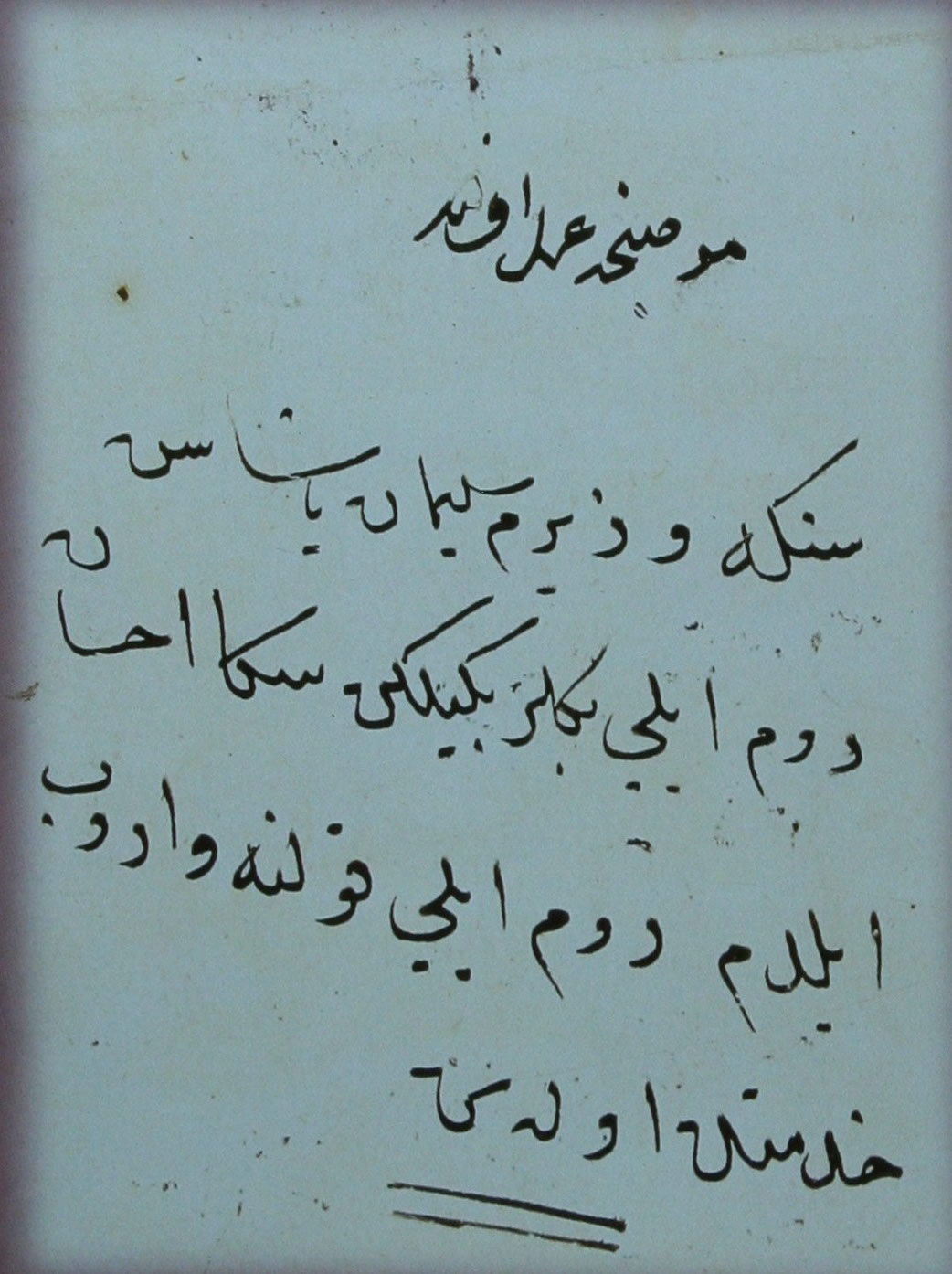
Note by Sultan Murad IV (in thick script on top) on the appointment document of Vizier Suleiman Pasha to the post of Beylerbey of Rumeli: "Be it done as required."

Routine decrees (ferman) or titles of privilege (berat) were written by a scribe, but those written to certain officials and those that were particularly important were preceded by the Sultan's handwritten note beside his seal (tughra). The tughra and the notation might be surrounded by a decorated frame. The note would emphasize a particular part of his edict, urging or ordering it to be followed without fault. These were called Hatt-ı Hümayunla Müveşşeh Ferman (ferman decorated with a hatt-ı hümayun) or Unvanına Hatt-ı Hümayun (hatt-ı hümayun to the title). The note might use a clichéd phrase like "to be done as required" (mûcebince amel oluna) or, "my command is to carried out as required and no one is to interfere with its execution" (emrim mûcebince amel oluna, kimseye müdahale etmeyeler). Some edicts to the title would start with a note from the Sultan praising the person(s) to whom the edict was addressed, in order to encourage or honor him. Rarely, there might be a threat such as "if you want to keep your head, carry out this order as required" (Başın gerek ise mûcebiyle amel oluna).

=== Hatt-ı hümayun on the white ===
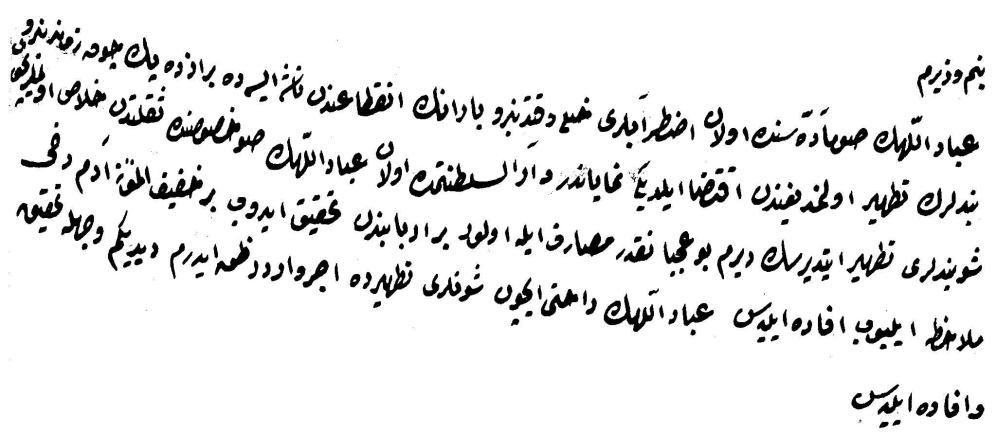
Hatt-ı hümayun on the white of Mahmud II to his grand vizier to look into the maintenance of dams in Istanbul to relieve the misery of his subjects during a drought.

"Hatt-ı hümayun on the white" (beyaz üzerine hatt-ı hümâyun) were documents originating with the sultan (ex officio) rather than a notation on an existing document. They were so called because the edict was written on a blank (i.e. white) page. They could be documents such as a command, an edict, an appointment letter or a letter to a foreign ruler.

There also exist hatt-ı hümayuns expressing the sultan's opinions or even his feelings on certain matters. For example, after the successful defense of Mosul against the forces of Nadir Shah, in 1743, Sultan Mahmud I sent a hatt-ı hümayun to the governor Haj Husayn Pasha, which praised in verse the heroic exploits of the governor and the warriors of Mosul.

=== Hatt-ı hümayun on a document ===
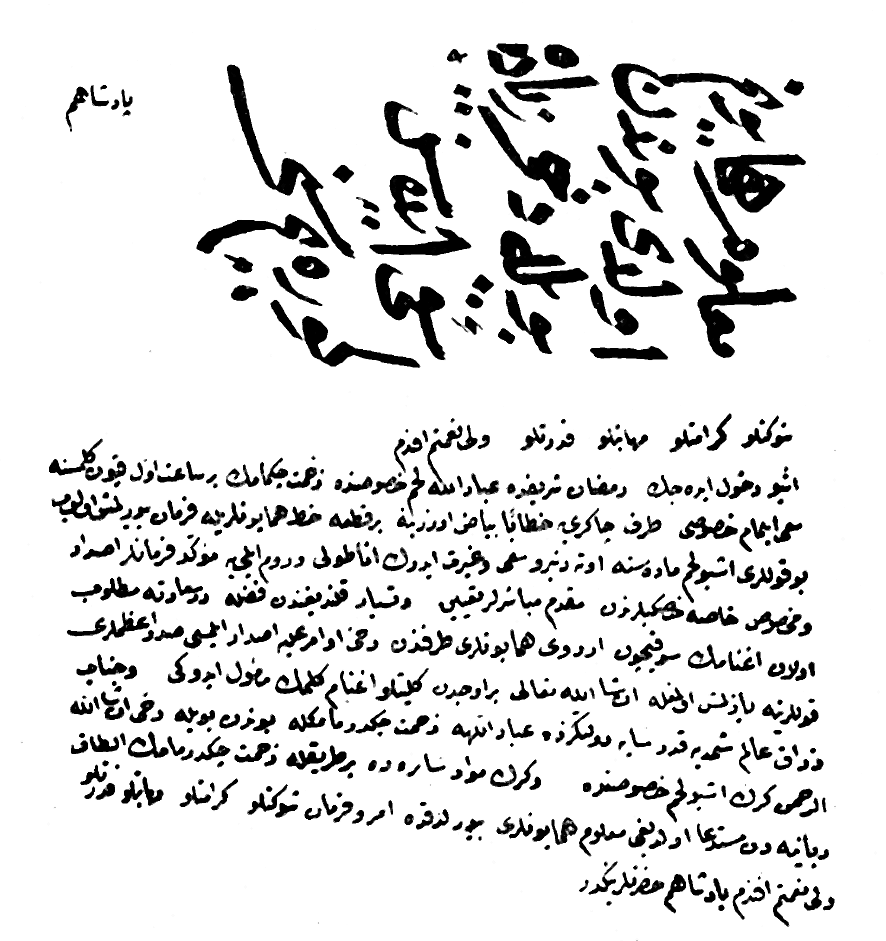
A hatt-ı hümâyûn of Selim III (in thick handwriting above) on a telhis (summary) written by the grand vizier regarding his efforts to ensure a sufficient supply of meat to Istanbul for the coming Ramadan. The Sultan writes his appreciation: "It has become my imperial knowledge. Do even more in the future. Let me see you."

In normal bureaucratic procedure, a document would be submitted by the grand vizier, or his deputy the kaymakam (Kâ'immakâm Paşa), who would summarize a situation for the Sultan, and request the Sultan's will on the matter. Such documents were called telhis (summary) until the 19th century and takrir (suggestion) later on. The Sultan's handwritten response (his command or decision) were called hatt-ı hümâyûn on telhis or hatt-ı hümâyûn on takrir. Other types of documents submitted to the Sultan were petitions (arzuhâl), sworn transcriptions of oral petitions (mahzar), reports from a higher to a lower office (şukka), religious reports by Qadis to higher offices (ilâm) and record books (tahrirat). These would be called hatt-ı hümâyûn on arz, hatt-ı hümâyûn on mahzar, etc. depending on the type of the document. The Sultan responded not only to documents submitted to him by his viziers but also to petitions (arzuhâl) submitted to him by his subjects following the Friday prayer. Thus, hatt-ı hümayuns on documents were analogous to Papal rescripts and rescripts used in other imperial regimes.

When the sultan contacted the public for Friday prayer or other occasions, people would hand in petitions addressed to him. These were later discussed and decided upon by the council of viziers. They would prepare a summary of all petitions and the action decided upon for each one. The sultan would write on the same sheet "I have been informed" (manzurum olmuştur) multiple times, followed by the item number to which he is referring. When palace bureaucracy was reorganized after the Tanzimat reforms, the Sultan's decision came to be written directly by the Chief Scribe at the bottom of the summary document, and this one writing applied to all decisions.

== Practices ==
When a petition or memo requiring the Sultan's decision was to be submitted to him, the grand vizier usually prepared an executive summary (telhis) as an attachment. In some cases, rather than prepare a separate summary document, the grand vizier or his deputy would write his summary and views diagonally, on the top or bottom margins of documents coming from lower functionaries (see an example in the first figure above). Such annotations on a written document were called derkenar. Sometimes the grand vizier would append a separate cover page on top of a proposal coming from a lower-level functionary like the Treasurer (Defterdar) or the Minister of Defence (Serasker), introducing it as, for example, "this is the proposal of the Defterdar". In such cases, the Sultan would write his hatt-ı hümayun on the cover page. In other cases, the grand vizier would summarize the matter directly in the margin of the document submitted by the lower functionary and the Sultan would write on the same page as well. Sometimes the Sultan would write his decision on a fresh piece of paper attached to the submitted document.

In most cases hatt-ı humayuns were written by the Sultan himself although there exist some that were penned by the chief scribe or another functionary. Important hatt-ı humayuns on the white were sometimes drafted by the head of diplomatic correspondence (Reis ül-Küttab) or the Secretary of Navy (Kapudan Paşa). In some cases, there were notations as to who prepared the draft of the document that was then re-written by the Sultan.

Hatt-ı hümayuns usually were not dated, although some, concerning withdrawal of money from the treasury, did carry dates. Most late-period hatt-ı hümayuns and irades had dates. Abdulhamid I was especially inclined to date his hatt-ı hümayuns. His grand vizier Koca Yusuf Pasha, later suggested this practice of dating hatt-ı hümayuns to Abdulhamid's successor Selim III so that he could follow up whether his orders were carried out. However, this suggestion was not adopted. Abdulhamid II used signatures toward the latter parts of his reign.

== Language ==
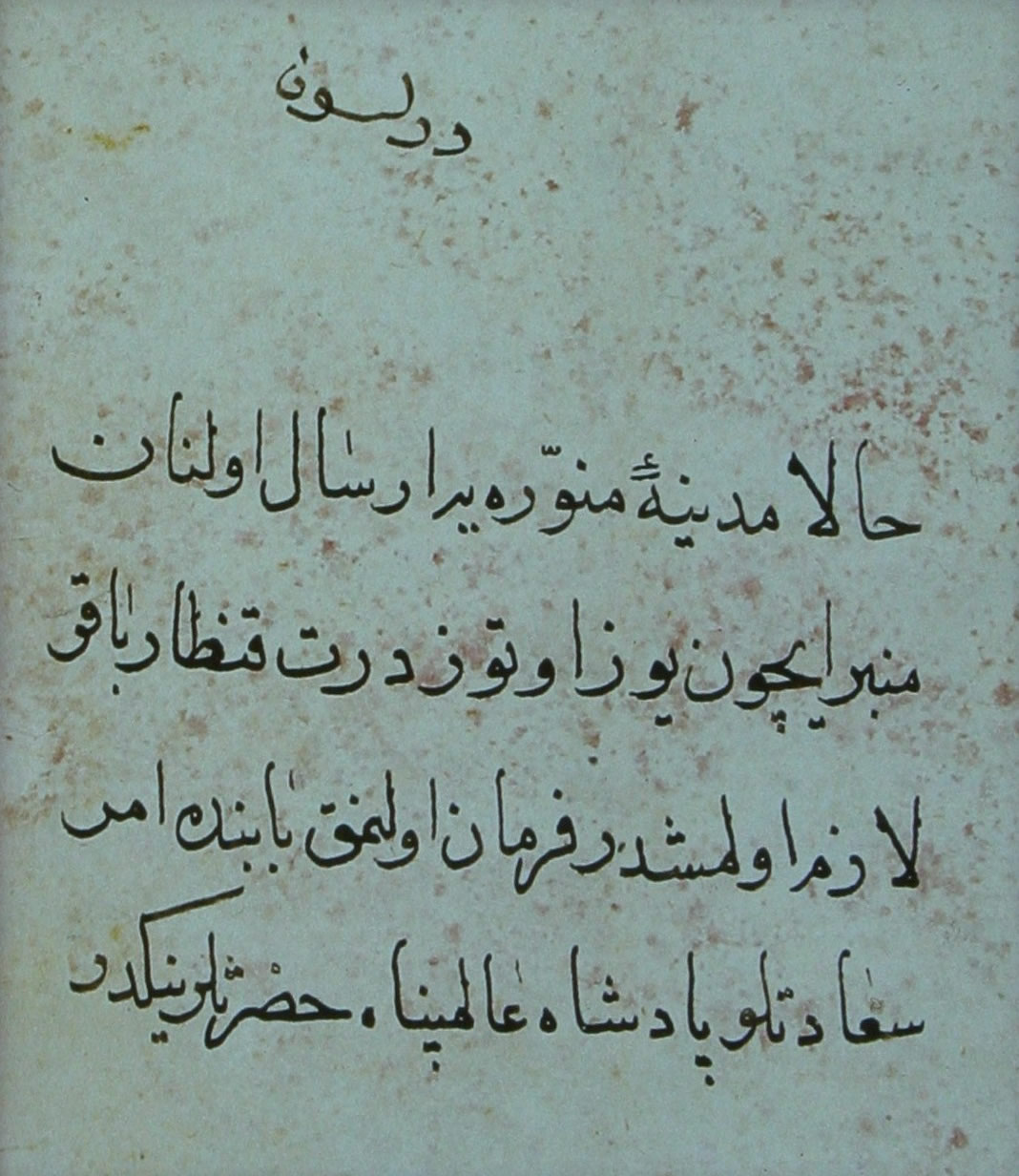
Upon note that the Minbar to be sent to Medina requires 134 kantars of copper, Süleyman I responds on the top, in his own handwriting, "Be it given."

The language of hatt-ı hümayuns on documents generally was a form of Turkish understandable (orally) even today and has changed little over the centuries. Many documents or annotations were short comments such as "I gave" (verdim), "be it given" (verilsin), "will not happen" (olmaz), "be it written" (yazılsın), "is clear/is clear to me" (malûm oldu / malûmum olmuştur), "provide it" (tedârük edesin), "it has come to my sight" (manzûrum oldu / manzûrum olmuştur), "be it answered" (cevap verile), "record it" (mukayyet olasın), "be it supplied" (tedârik görülsün), "be they without need" ("berhûrdâr olsunlar").

Some Sultans would write longer comments, starting with "It has become my knowledge" (Malûmum oldu), and continue with an introduction on the topic, then give their opinion such as "this report's/petition's/record's/etc. appearance and meaning has become my imperial knowledge"("... işbu takrîrin/telhîsin/şukkanın/kaimenin manzûr ve me'azi ma'lûm-ı hümayûnum olmuşdur"). Some common phrases in hatt-ı hümayuns are "according to this report..." (işbu telhisin mûcebince), "the matter is clear" (cümlesi malumdur), "I permit" (izin verdim), "I give, according to the provided facts" (vech-i meşruh üzere verdim).

Hatt-ı hümayuns to the position often had clichéd expressions such as "To be done as required" (Mûcebince amel oluna) or "To be done as required, not to be contravened" (Mûcebince amel ve hilâfından hazer oluna).

Hatt-ı hümayuns on the white were more elaborate and some may have been drafted by a scribe before being penned by the Sultan. They often started by addressing the recipient. The Sultan would refer to his grand vizier as "My Vizier", or if his grand vizier was away at war, would refer to his deputy as "Ka'immakâm Paşa". Those written to other officials would often start with an expression like "You who are my Vizier of Rumeli, Mehmed Pasha" ("Sen ki Rumili vezîrim Mehmed Paşa'sın"). The head of religious affairs (Şeyhülislam) or the Sultan's personal tutor would be addressed simply and respectfully. In cases where the hatt-ı hümayun was to be delivered ceremoniously, with an imperial sword and a cloak, as in an appointment to a high rank, there would be a flowery salutation such as "after I have honored you with my glorious greeting you should know that..." (seni selâm-ı şâhanemle teşrif eylediğimden sonra malumun ola ki...). Correspondence to a military commander could have a lengthy and ornate salutation or just address him by his title. A note without an address was meant for the grand vizier or his deputy.

== History ==
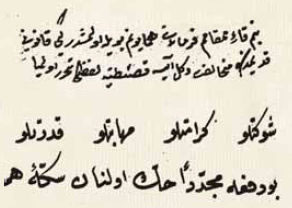
Response (ca. 1788) of Selim III on a memorandum regarding printing "İslâmbol" instead of "Kostantiniye" on new coins: "My Deputy Grand Vizier! My imperial decree has been that, if not contrary to current law, the word of Konstantiniye is not to be printed."

The earliest known hatt-ı hümayun is the one sent by Sultan Murad I to Evrenos Bey in 1386, commending the commander for his conquests and giving him advice on how to administer people. Until the reign of Murad III, Viziers used to present matters orally to the Sultans, who would then give their consent or denial, also orally. While hatt-ı hümayuns were very rare prior to this, they proliferated afterward, especially during the reigns of Sultans such as Abdülhamid I, Selim III and Mahmud II, who wanted to increase their control and be informed of everything.

The content of hatt-ı hümayuns tends to reflect the power struggle that existed between the Sultan and his council of viziers (the Divan). The process of using the hatt-ı hümayun to authorize the actions of the grand vizier came into existence in the reign of Murad III. This led to a loss of authority and independence in the grand vizier while other palace people such as the Master of the Harem (Harem Ağası) or concubines (cariye), especially (Valide Sultan) who had greater access to the Sultan gained in influence. The mothers of the sultans, such as Nurbanu Sultan and Safiye Sultan, during the reign of their sons, in order to exercise power, by secret alliance with the Grand Viziers and some important members of the Divan, they overshadowed the authority of the Sultan; Moreover separately by influencing the decisions of the Sultan, who had direct and intimate access to the Sultan's person, they often influenced government decisions bypassing the Divan and the Grand Vizier altogether. Even Handan Sultan, Halime Sultan, Kosem Sultan and Turhan Sultan acted on their behalf because of their sons' youth or incapacity and they were responsible for key decisions (removals and major promotions in the government) that were in the hands of the Sultan. By giving detailed instructions or advice, the Sultans reduced the role of the grand viziers to be just a supervisor to the execution of his commands. This situation appears to have created some backlash, as during most of the 17th century there were attempts to return to grand viziers' prestige and the power of "supreme proxy" (vekil-i mutlak) and over time hatt-ı hümayuns returned to their former simplicity. However, in the eighteenth century, Selim III became concerned by the over-centralization of the bureaucracy and its general inefficacy. He created consulting bodies (meclis-i meşveret) to share some of the authority with him and the grand vizier. He would give detailed answers on hatt-ı hümayuns to questions asked of him and would make inquiries as to whether his decisions were followed. The hatt-ı hümayun became Selim III's tool to ensure rapid and precise execution of his decisions.

During the reign of Mahmud II, in the early 1830s, the practice of writing on the memoranda of the grand vizier was replaced by the Chief Scribe of the Mabeyn-i hümayun (Mabeyn-i hümayun başkatibi) recording the Sultan's decision. After the Tanzimat, the government bureaucracy was streamlined. For most routine communications, the imperial scribe (Serkâtib-i şehriyârî) began to record the spoken will (irâde) of the Sultan and thus the irâde (also called irâde-i seniyye, i.e., "supreme will", or irâde-i şâhâne, i.e., "glorious will") replaced the hatt-ı hümayun. The use of hatt-ı hümayuns on the white between the Sultan and the grand vizier continued on for matters of great importance such as high level appointments or promotions. Infrequently, the grand vizier and the Sultan wrote to each other directly as well.

The large number of documents that required the Sultan's decision through either a hatt-ı hümayun or an irade-i senniye is considered to be an indication of how centralized the Ottoman government was. Abdülhamid I has written himself in one of his hatt-ı hümayuns "I have no time that my pen leaves my hand, with God's resolve it does not."

The early hatt-ı hümayuns were written in the calligraphic styles of tâlik, tâlik kırması (a variant of tâlik), nesih and riq'a. After Mahmud II, they were only written in riq'a. Ahmed III and Mahmud II were skilled penmen and their hatt-ı hümayuns are notable for their long and elaborate annotations on official documents. In contrast, Sultans who accessed the throne at an early age, such as Murad V and Mehmed IV display poor spelling and calligraphy.

== Archival ==
Hatt-ı hümayuns sent to the grand vizier were handled and recorded at the Âmedi Kalemi, the secretariat of the grand vizier. The Âmedi Kalemi organized and recorded all correspondence between the grand vizier and the Sultan, as well as any correspondence with foreign rulers and with Ottoman ambassadors. Other hatt-ı hümayuns, not addressed to the grand vizier, were stored in other document stores (called fon in the terminology of current Turkish archivists).

=== Cut-out hatt-ı hümayuns ===
During the creation of the State Archives in the nineteenth century, documents were organized according to their importance. Hatt-ı hümayuns on the white were considered the most important, along with those on international relations, border transactions and internal regulations. Documents of secondary importance were routinely placed in trunks and stored in cellars in need of repair. Presumably as a sign of respect toward the Sultan, hatt-ı hümayuns on documents (petitions, reports, etc.) were cut out and stored together with the hatt-ı hümayuns on the white, while the rest of the documents were stored elsewhere. These cut-out hatt-ı hümayuns were not cross-referenced with the documents to which they referred and were only annotated by the palace office using general terms and an approximate date. Because Sultans were not in the habit of dating their hatt-ı hümayuns until the late period of the empire, in most cases the documents associated with them are not known. Conversely, the decisions on many a memorandum, petition, or request submitted to the Sultan are unknown. The separation of hatt-ı hümayuns from their documents is considered a great loss of information for researchers. The Ottoman Archives in Istanbul has a special section of "cut-out hatt-ı hümayuns".

=== Catalogs ===
Today all known hatt-ı hümayuns have been recorded in a computerized database in the Ottoman Archives of the Turkish Prime Minister (Başbakanlık Osmanlı Arşivleri, or BOA in short) in Istanbul, and they number 95,134. Most hatt-ı hümayuns are stored at the BOA and in the Topkapı Museum Archive. The BOA contains 58,000 hatt-ı hümayuns.

Because the hatt-ı hümayuns were originally not organized systematically, historians in the nineteenth and early twentieth century created several catalogs of hatt-ı hümayuns based on different organizing principles. These historic catalogs are still in use by historians at the BOA:

Hatt-ı Hümâyûn Tasnifi is the catalog of the hatt-ı hümayuns belonging to the Âmedi Kalemi. It consists of 31 volumes listing 62,312 documents, with their short summaries. This catalog lists documents from 1730 to 1839 but covers primarily those from the reigns of Selim III and Mahmud II within this period.

Ali Emiri Tasnifi is a chronological catalog of 181,239 documents organized according to the periods of sovereignty of Sultans, from the foundation of the Ottoman state to the Abdülmecid period. Along with hatt-ı hümayuns, this catalog includes documents on foreign relations.

İbnülemin Tasnifi is a catalog created by a committee led by historian İbnülemin Mahmud Kemal. It covers the period of 1290–1873. Along with 329 hatt-ı hümayuns, it lists documents of various other types relating to palace correspondence, private correspondence, appointments, taxation, land grants (timar and zeamet), and charitable endowments (vakıf).

Muallim Cevdet Tasnifi catalogs 216,572 documents in 34 volumes, organized by topics that include local governments, provincial administration, vakıf and internal security.

== The Hatt-ı Hümâyun of 1856 ==
Although there exist thousands of hatt-ı hümayuns, the Imperial Reform Edict (or Islâhat Fermânı) of 1856 is well enough known that most history texts refer to it simply as "Hatt-i Hümayun". This decree from Sultan Abdülmecid I promised equality in education, government appointments, and administration of justice to all, regardless of creed. In Düstur, the Ottoman code of laws, the text of this ferman is introduced as "a copy of the supreme ferman written to the grand vizier, perfected by decoration above with a hatt-ı hümayun." So, technically this edict was a hatt-ı hümayun to the rank.

The Reform Decree of 1856 is sometimes referred to by another name, "The Rescript of Reform". Here, the word 'rescript' is used to sense of "edict, decree", not "reply to a query or other document."

The Hatt-ı Hümayun of 1856 was an extension of another important edict of reform, the Hatt-i Sharif of Gülhane of 1839, and part of the Tanzimat reforms. That document is also generally referred to as "The Hatt-i Sharif", although there are many other hatt-i sharifs, a term that is synonymous with hatt-ı hümayun.

== The Sultan's script ==
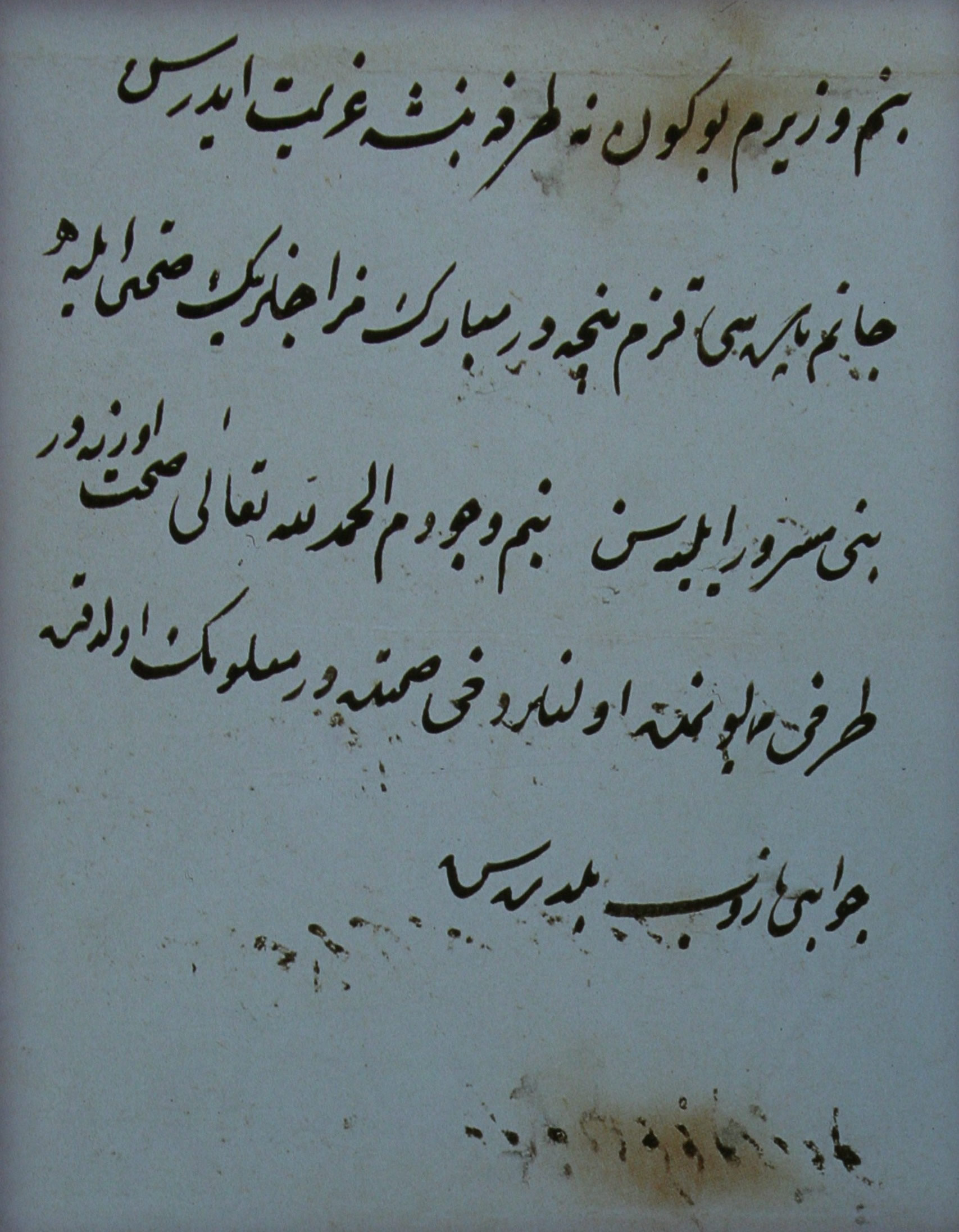
A non-official hatt-ı hümayun between Ahmed III and his grand vizier. "My Vizier. Today where do you intend to go? How is my girl, the piece of my life? Make me happy with news of the health of your holy disposition. My body is in good health, thank be God. Those of my imperial family are in good health as well. Let me know when you know."

The term hatt-ı hümayun is occasionally used in the literal sense of the handwriting of the Sultan. For example, the imperial poet Nef'i has written a masnavi of 22 couplets describing the calligraphy of Sultan Murad IV, called Der-Vasf-ı Hatt-ı Humayun-ı Sultan Murad Han. The whole poem is a compliment to the writings of the Sultan.

== See also ==
- Berat (Ottoman Empire)
