= Corps de droit ottoman =

Collection of Ottoman Empire law edited by George Young

Corps de droit ottoman Volume 1

Corps de droit ottoman; recueil des codes, lois, règlements, ordonnances et actes les plus importants du droit intérieur, et d'études sur le droit coutumier de l'Empire ottoman ("Ottoman Body of Law: Compendium the Most Important Codes, Laws, Regulations, and Acts of Domestic Law, and Studies of Customary Law, of the Ottoman Empire") is a 1905–1906 seven-volume French-language collection of Ottoman Empire law edited by George Young (1872–1952), published by Clarendon Press in the United Kingdom.

D. G. Hogarth of The English Historical Review wrote that the author's main concern was constituent legislation and that the work "is not intended to be a complete publication of either the civil or the criminal code in use."

Part I, Volumes I–III, were published in 1905, while Part II, Volumes IV–VI, were published in 1906.

== Background ==
Young worked for Embassy of the United Kingdom in the Ottoman Empire in Constantinople (now Istanbul). At the time of publication he worked for the Embassy of the United Kingdom in Spain as a second secretary. An archivist and other officials assisted him in his efforts. He had no background in Asian studies nor in law.

Young used non-public material, including the archives of the UK embassy in Constantinople, to build his book. In regards to the embassy archival work Hogarth stated that it was done "under certain well-known restrictions, of course".

== Contents ==
Each book has a table of contents, as well as an introduction written in English. There is no index. Young provided explanatory notes for each category.

Volume I describes law relating to the courts and government, including immovable property.

Volume II describes law relating to the military, non-Muslim millets, and public order.

Volume III describes foreign affairs, maritime affairs, and public health.

Hogarth wrote that the book highlights "the inferior position which British capital and enterprise hold in Turkey in comparison with the capital and enterprise of other nations, notably the French."

Hogarth also stated "Whenever possible he puts in a good word for the existing régime in Turkey" and that "It is obvious that (as he warns us in his preface) he has not said the whole truth in every case. Certain susceptibilities and interests have had to be considered."

== Reception ==
Hogarth praised the book, stating that there was no hitherto book covering its ground. Hogarth concluded "We hope enough has been said to recommend these valuable volumes to historical students." He stated that it would have been nice had Ottoman Turkish original documents been included, as that while there were relatively few people who would study the originals, including the originals would have benefited them and the inclusion "unquestionably would have secured the fame of this book as a permanent and final work of reference." Hogarth added that there were some minor errors, "but none of much importance."

Law Quarterly Review wrote that while the work was not likely to be read by a large audience, "he has made excellent use of his opportunities" and "it is a credit" to his publishers and to the British diplomatic staff.

== See also ==
- Law of the Ottoman Empire
- Législation ottomane, a collection of Ottoman law translated into French, published by Gregory Aristarchis
