= Berat (Ottoman Empire) =

License issued by the Ottoman authorities to non-Muslims

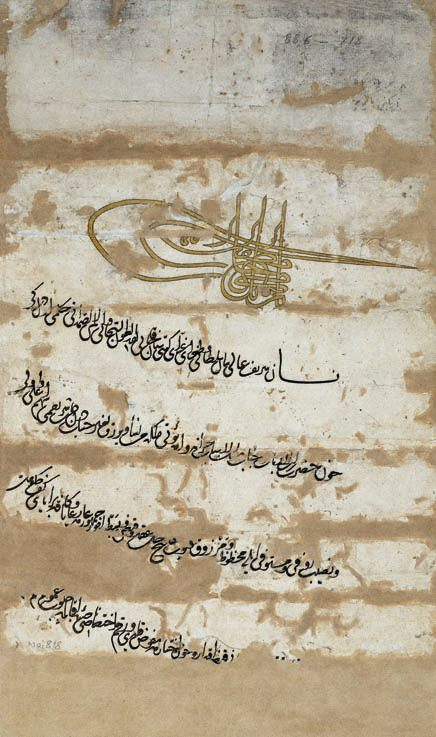
Earlier berat, of Bayezid II appointing a beylerbey.

Berat (Ottoman Turkish: برات, from Arabic barā’t, "letter") is the Turkish name for a document, i.e. a decree most often of an economic or financial nature, or by which someone is appointed to serve in the state administration or army. In the Ottoman Empire, berats were issued in the name of the sultan, and the procedure for their issuance was under the jurisdiction of the Grand Vizier. When the new sultan came to power, all berats had to be restored, and these were known tekdid-i berat (تجديد برات). They are made in a specific format, decorated with the Sultan's tugra (stylized signature). Special berats were also issued to higher religious elders, upon state confirmation of their entry into the appropriate duties. On this basis, every Orthodox hierarch in the Ottoman Empire was also required to have a sultan's berat. Special berat-holders were known as beratlı.

There were berats issued to non-Muslims that granted them tax exemptions and access to European Law by which they became influential merchants known as "honorary dragomans".

== See also ==
- Hatt-i humayun
