= Demetrius Nicolaides =

Ottoman Greek journalist (c. 1843–1915)

Demetrius Nicolaides (Greek: Δημήτριος Νικολαΐδης Dimitrios Nikolaidis; French: Démétrius Nicolaïdes; c. 1843 – 3 July 1915), also known as Nikolaidis Efendi, was an Ottoman Greek journalist and compiler of legislation. Johann Strauss, author of A Constitution for a Multilingual Empire: Translations of the Kanun-ı Esasi and Other Official Texts into Minority Languages, wrote that Nicolaides was "an extremely active but somewhat enigmatic figure in the press life of 19th century Istanbul".

Nicolaides was born and raised in Ottoman Constantinople (now Istanbul) and attended the Great School of the Nation (Megalē tou Genous scholē), from which he graduated in 1861. His family was the Ieromnimon.

== Career ==
He began editing the Anatolikos Astēr in 1862. In 1864, he left the first publication and began editing Heptalophos; he received ownership of it in 1865 and renamed it Nea Eptalofos. It became a newspaper in 1867, and it was renamed Kōnstantinoupolis after that. During periods when Kōnstantinoupolis was not in operation, Nicolaides edited Thrakē ("Thrace"; August 1870 – 1880) and Avgi ("Aurora"; 6 July 1880 – 10 July 1884).

He edited a French-language collection of Ottoman law, Législation ottomane, that was published by Gregory Aristarchis. He also edited the Greek version of the Düstur, Оθωμανικοί Κώδηκες ("Othōmanikoi kōdēkes", meaning "Ottoman Codes", with Demotic Greek using "Οθωμανικοί κώδικες"), its first non-Turkish version. These two publications enriched him financially, giving him money used to operate his newspapers. After the Ottoman government received the Greek version, it made him a third-class civil servant. Nicolaides also wrote a document stating that he translated volumes of the Dustür and the Mecelle into Bulgarian. The Bulgarian copies of the Dustür circulating stated that they were written by Christo S. Arnaudov (Bulgarian: Христо С. Арнаудовъ; Post-1945 spelling: Христо С. Арнаудов), who published it. Johann Straus concluded that the Bulgarian version probably originated from Nicolaides's Greek version due to "striking similarities" between the two, even though the Bulgarian one says that it was a collaborative work that was directly translated from Ottoman Turkish.

A Konstantinoupolis employee, Manuel Gedeon, wrote that Nicolaides, Christoforos Samartzidis, and a person Gedeon described as "another impostor" together published a French version of Pharos of the Bosphorus (or Lighthouse of the Bosphorus). Gedeon stated that Nicolaides obtained 5,000 gold francs from the Ambassador of Russia to the Ottoman Empire, Ignatieff, to fund this publication, and that he did not give much of this away to other parties. According to Gedeon, Theodoros Kasapis wrote in Diogenis that the Russian ambassador had bribed Nicolaides.

Nicolaides also applied to have his own Karamanli Turkish publication, Asya, but was denied. Evangelina Baltia and Ayșe Kavak, authors of Publisher of the newspaper Konstantinoupolis for half a century, wrote that they could find no information explaining why Nicolaides' proposal was turned down. Ultimately, in 1889, he established an Ottoman Turkish newspaper, Servet. Servet-i Fünûn was originally a supplement of Servet.

For a period, his main printing facility was at Millet Han in Galata. He applied to move to a new facility twice, to Financılar Yokuşu in 1899, approved but not completed, and then to Lloyd Han in 1902, also approved. The move was completed by 1903.

Because Nicolaidis tried to save his newspapers no matter what it took, he sold his possessions and lost his wealth.

== Life and death ==
He had a wife, Sevastitsa, two sons (Nikolakis "Nikos" and Georgakis) and a daughter, who married in 1892. He invited Sultan Abdulhamid II to his daughter's wedding. Balta and Kavak stated that this illustrated the close relationship between the Ottoman government and Nicolaides. He himself was in favour of Ottomanism.

According to Gedeon, Nicolaides had a house in Phanar (now Fener), one in Mouchli and one in Antigone (now Burgazada) in the Princes' Islands. An 1894 earthquake ruined the Mouchli house.

In 1915, Nicolaides died a poor man, and his children were not present as they were in different places. Rum Millet community members living in Pera (Beyoğlu) and friends paid for his funeral, which was officiated by the Ecumenical Patriarch of Constantinople, Germanus V.

== Awards ==
Nicolaides received medals: the Ücüncü Rütbe'den Mecidî nişani after requesting so from the Ottoman government, the Serbian Ücüncü Rütbe'den Takova nişani, a third degree award and then second and first degree medals, Saniye Rütbesi and Mütemayize Rütbesi, the last in 1893. He also received the Gold Cross of the Holy Sepulcher and the Gold Cross of the Holy Savior.

== See also ==
- Phanariotes
- Media of the Ottoman Empire
