= Düstur =

Set of laws

The Ottoman Turkish version of the Düstur

The Ottoman Code of Public Laws, also known as the Düstur or Destur or Doustour, was a set of laws in the Ottoman Empire. It includes the penal code as well as some civil and commercial laws.

The first Ottoman Turkish volume was published in 1862, and the second was published in 1865. Serialization began in 1872, and the first volume labeled "Destur" was published in 1873. The final volume was published in 1886.

M. Safa Saraçoğlu, author of "Economic Interventionism, Islamic Law and Provincial Government in the Ottoman Empire," stated that its style and structure are similar to that of the 1851 legal collection Mecmu'a-yı Kavanin.

== Name ==
The name Dustûr in Ottoman Turkish is a loanword from Arabic which ultimately comes from the Persian word dastūr (دَسْتور), meaning 'law collection' (one of several senses of the word). The Persian and Turkish use of the word also influenced the Arabic word Dustur (Arabic: دُسْتور, romanized: Dustūr), which is the literal translation of Constitution. French orthography was the preferred system for the romanization of Ottoman during the Imperial era, as the French was lingua franca of the 19th century, hence the name Doustour.

== Contents ==
The Düstur was intended to provide a framework for governance and outline the rights and responsibilities of both the government and its subjects. It aimed to establish a constitutional monarchy in the Ottoman Empire, granting certain rights to citizens and limiting the powers of the ruling Sultan.

The Düstur consisted of two parts: the Basic Law (Kanun-ı Esasi) and the Regulation of the Council of Ministers. The Basic Law outlined the fundamental principles of the government, including the division of powers, the rights of citizens, and the structure of the legislative and executive branches. The Regulation of the Council of Ministers outlined the functioning and responsibilities of the Council.

The introduction of the Düstur was a significant step towards constitutionalism in the Ottoman Empire. It created a framework for a more representative government, with the General Assembly (Meclis-i Umumi) established as a legislative body that represented various regions and communities within the empire.

However, the implementation and enforcement of the Düstur faced challenges and setbacks. Political instability, conflicts, and resistance from conservative forces hindered its full realization. The Sultan and some factions within the empire were hesitant to relinquish power, and the Düstur was suspended multiple times during its existence.

Ultimately, the Düstur played a role in the broader historical developments in the Ottoman Empire and the eventual establishment of a more modern constitutional system. While its implementation was limited and its impact varied, it served as a foundation for subsequent constitutional reforms in the empire. The later volumes include a copy of an 1849 provincial council code.

== Translations ==
=== Greek ===
Greek version

Demetrius Nicolaides published the first Greek translation, Ὀθωμανικοὶ Κώδηκες ("Othōmanikoi kōdēkes", meaning "Ottoman Codes", with Demotic Greek using "Οθωμανικοί Κώδικες"), in 1871, making it the first version of the Destur not in any variety of Turkish. Nicolaides used the publishing company of Eptalofos to do this, and bundled copies with his newspapers. He advertised the translation in the supplements of his newspapers and personally. At one time the price was 400 piastres.

Nicolaides, who indicated in applications to the Ottoman press office that he intended to help increase the job performance of employees of the Ottoman government who belonged to the Rum Millet (as in Greek-speaking employees), stated that even a complete collection of such laws in Ottoman Turkish did not exist, and that his was the only one that was complete. He received favours from the Ottoman government as a reward for his work, and this enriched him, giving him money used to operate his newspapers.

Publication of an annex ("parartēma") began in 1874. The publishers of Thrake ("Thrace"), another publication of Nicolaides, published additional "Law Annexes" translated by Kon. G. Vayannis from 1879 to 1881.

Nicolaides requested the Ottoman government to allow him to publish an updated Greek version, and the state let him do this on the condition that he publish the updated version in the same manner as the previous one. From 1889 to 1891 the second edition was distributed, with four volumes. In order to have his costs paid for and to spread the knowledge in the codes, he requested that Orthodox Greek members of local and regional governments buy the Greek Düstur. Sultan of the Ottoman Empire Abdulhamid II gave Nicolaides, through the Ottoman Internal Affairs fund, 5,000 piastres due to the translations of the legal documents. He made requests to vilayet governments to buy the books again in 1893, as well as to Greeks working for private companies. The price of the Greek Düstur declined to 300 piastres after Nicolaides successfully petitioned the government to do so in 1892. After a natural disaster destroyed one of his houses in 1894, Nicolaides asked Ottoman government ministries to buy or promote the book to help resolve his debts.

==== Authorship of the Greek version ====
The main dragoman at the embassy of Greece in Constantinople (now Istanbul), D. Rhazes, translated the Ottoman land and taxation codes into Greek, and those codes were used in the Greek Düstur. Johann Strauss, author of A Constitution for a Multilingual Empire: Translations of the Kanun-ı Esasi and Other Official Texts into Minority Languages, wrote that as the French version of the land codes in another law collection, Législation ottomane, was later revised with the Rhazes version in mind, "This Greek version was apparently held in such high esteem".

Nicolaides also included a Greek translation of the Ottoman Reform Edict of 1856 made from the official Ottoman Empire French version, with several notes attached from a different French translation of the edict made by François Belin. Nicolaides included additional notes including an 1860-issued berat in Greek, and removed some of Belin's notes; Johann Strauss argued that they were excised "probably because [Nicolaides] considered them too critical".

The Ottoman Commercial Code (Ticaret kanunu) was about the same as the French Code de commerce, and the Greek collection's version was translated from the French, with the translation stating this explicitly. The document has an annex in the Greek language that explains how the Turkish and French models are different.

==== Reception to the Greek version ====
British lawyer John Alexander Strachey Bucknill wrote that for Nicolaides "high praise is due as it is an accurate and useful rendering". George Young, the author of Corps de droit ottoman, stated that there were inconsistencies in the translation and that the work lacked an index.

=== French ===
A portion of the French version of the Düstur, in Législation ottomane, published by Gregory Aristarchis and edited by Demetrius Nicolaides

A French version of the Düstur was included in Législation ottomane, volumes one through five, with the fifth titled as Doustour-i-hamidié. L. Rota, a lawyer stated by Strauss to be "probably of Levantine origin" located in Constantinople, translated several texts in the Législation ottomane collection. Mihran Chirinian, an ethnic Armenian, assisted him in the translations of content in volumes 1-3 and 5.

Nicolaides requested the Ottoman government to allow him to publish an updated French version, and the state let him do this on the condition that he publish the updated version in the same manner as the previous one. The Ottoman Imperial Command paid him 100 Ottoman lira in 1887 as a reward for his translation of the codes into French.

=== Bulgarian ===
Volume 1 of the Bulgarian version

Christo S. Arnaudov (Bulgarian: Христо С. Арнаудовъ; Post-1945 spelling: Христо С. Арнаудов) published the Bulgarian version, titled "Complete Collection of the State Laws, Regulations, Instructions, and High Orders of the Ottoman Empire” (Пълно събрание на държавните закони, устави, наставления и високи заповеди на Османската империя Pălno săbranie na dăržavnyte Zakoni, Ustavy, Nastavleniya i Vysoky Zapovedi na Osmanskata Imperia). Volumes one through three were published in Constantinople in 1871, 1872, and 1873 while volume four was published in Sofia, Bulgaria in 1886.

Straus concluded that the Bulgarian version likely originated from Nicolaides's Greek version due to "striking similarities" between the two, even though the Bulgarian one states that it was a collaborative work that was directly translated from Ottoman Turkish. Strauss stated that the introduction was "mostly a literal translation" of the Greek one and that the notes "are almost identical". Nicolaides had in fact wrote a document in which he stated that he translated volumes of the Dustür and the Mecelle into Bulgarian. He lacked funds to publish the entire collection; vilayet council leaders agreed to fund the distribution of these volumes. He had translated two volumes which together had half of the Düstur and Mecelle laws at the time.

The Bulgarian version includes material absent from the Ottoman Turkish version, including copies of treaties made with other countries.

=== Others ===
Moïse del Médico (a.k.a. "Moiz Bey Dalmediko", 1848-1937) and David Fresco (1850-1933) published Koleksyon de las leyes, reglamentos, ordenanzas i instruksyones del Imperio Otomano, the translation of the Düstur into Judaeo-Spanish (Ladino), in 1881.

The Düstur was also published in Arabic, even though Ziya Pasha wrote a satirical article about the difficulty of translating it into Arabic, suggesting that Ottoman Turkish needs to be changed to make governance easier.

Evangelinos Misalaidis, from 1861 to 1871, released a translation in Karamanli Turkish (Turkish in Greek characters).

In addition it was published in Armenian and Armeno-Turkish (Turkish in Armenian characters).

== See also ==
- Ottoman law
