= Akhtar (magazine) =

Persian magazine published in the Ottoman Empire (1876–1896)

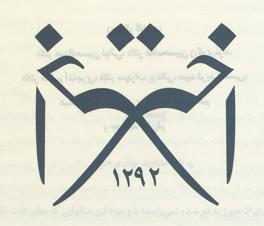
- Editor: Mīrzā Mehdī Tabrīzī
- Categories: Political magazine
- Publisher: Āqā Moḥammad Tabrīzī
- Founded: 1876
- First issue: 13 January 1876
- Final issue: 7 September 1896
- Country: Ottoman Empire
- Based in: Constantinople
- Language: Persian
- Website: Akhtar

Akhtar (Persian: اختر, lit. 'The Star') was a Persian-language periodical published in Constantinople, the capital of the Ottoman Empire, between 1876 and 1896.

== History and profile ==
Akhtar was launched in 1876 following the suggestion of the Iranian ambassador in Constantinople at that time, and was published until 1896. Editor and director was Agha Mohammed Taher Tabrizi, and the editor in chief Mirza Mehdi Tabrizi (1839–1907) was the founder of the Khorshid Publishing House in Constantinople who later edited another magazine entitled Hekmat (1892–1912) in Cairo. Mirza Mohammad Ali Khan Kashani, founded the periodical Sorayya (1898–1900) which was later published in Cairo, also briefly worked for the journal. Akhtar was the first Persian magazine to be published outside Iran.

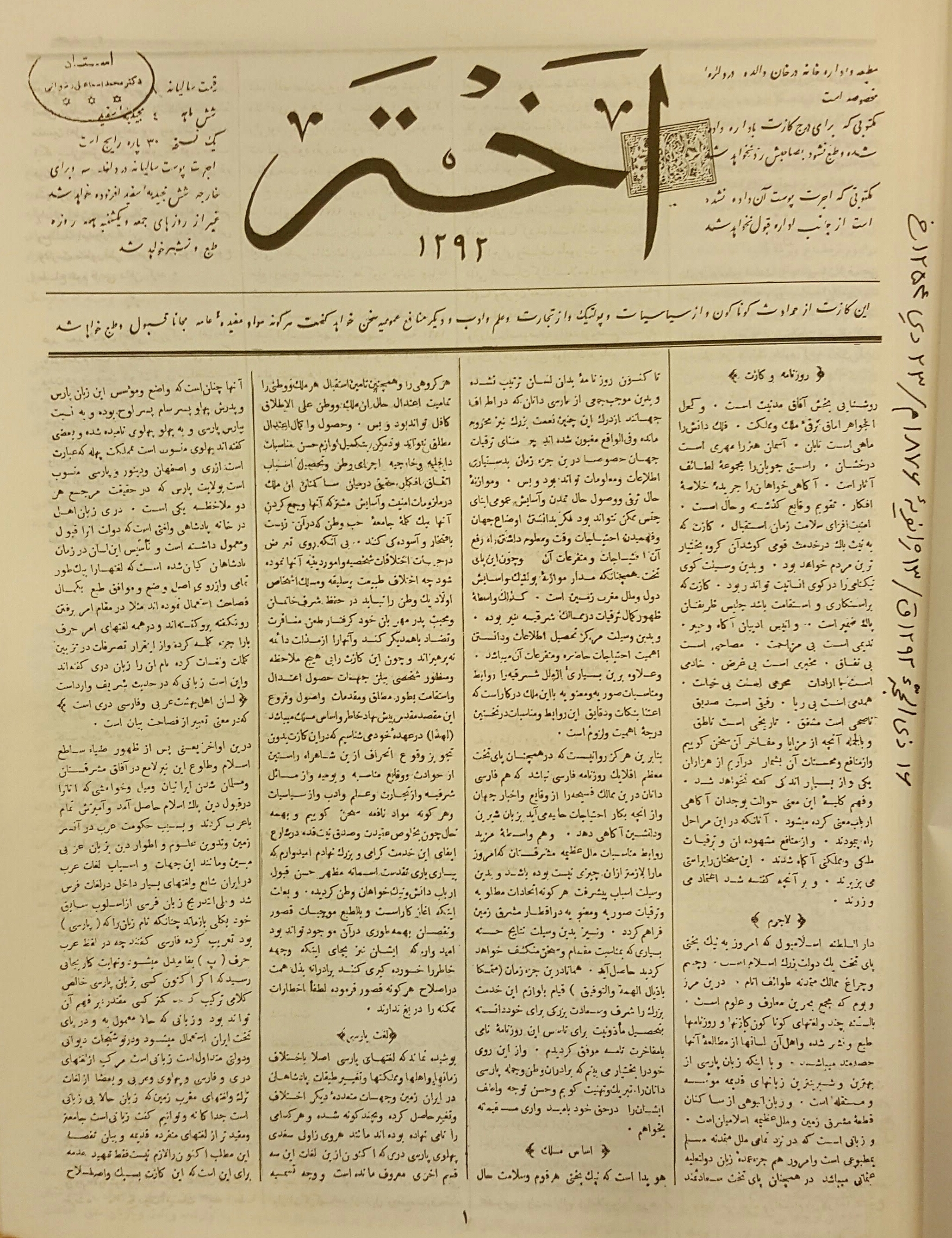
No. 1, 13 January 1876, p. 1

At the beginning, Akhtar – the first non-official press medium – was published almost daily, later twice, and eventually once a week. The distribution of this journal extended from many cities of Iran and the Ottoman Empire to the Caucasus and South East Asia. It served as a mouthpiece for Iranians in diaspora and was used by the Iranian embassy and the consulate in Constantinople as a newsletter. Alongside political daily reports it contained domestic and international news, articles on scientific and literary topics as well as reports from correspondents and letters from Iran. Among its notable contributors were Mirza Aqa Khan Kermani, Shaykh Ahmad Ruhi and Mirza Mehdi Tabrizi. According to contemporaneous Iranologist Edward Granville Browne, writing in 1888, Akhtar was "the only Persian publication worth reading".

Even though Akhtar as a journal published in exile could report more freely, the Ottoman censors suspended it several times. The inspector for the publication was Bahaaddin Veled İzbudak, a Persian scholar. After the assassination of Iranian monarch Naser al-Din Shah Qajar in 1896, the Ottoman government permanently banned the journal.

== See also ==
- Iran-Turkey relations

== Sources ==
- Elwell-Sutton, L. P. (1984). "AḴTAR newspaper". In Yarshater, Ehsan (ed.). Encyclopædia Iranica. Vol. I/7: Ahriman–Alafrank. London and New York: Routledge & Kegan Paul. p. 730. ISBN 978-0-71009-096-6.
