= Législation ottomane =

1870s collection of Ottoman law

Volume 1

Législation ottomane, ou Recueil des lois, règlements, ordonnances, traités, capitulations et autres documents officiels de l'Empire ottoman is a collection of Ottoman law published by Gregory Aristarchis (as Grégoire Aristarchi) and edited by Demetrius Nicolaides (as Démétrius Nicolaïdes). The volumes were published from 1873 to 1888.

The Législation Ottomane was one of the first collections of the Ottoman Law in seven volumes in French, Aristarchis is named in most volumes, except for 6–7, which, according to Strauss, "seem to have been edited solely by Demetrius Nicolaides". The collection was intended for foreigners living in the empire, including employees of foreign ministries. Strauss described it as the "best-known example of" a collection of Ottoman laws.

Volume 1 was published in 1873, Volumes 2–4 were published in 1874, Volume 5 was published in 1878, Volume 6 was published in 1881, and Volume VII was published in 1888.

This publication, along with the Greek version of the Ottoman Code of Public Laws (Düstur), enriched Nicolaides financially, giving him money used to operate his newspapers. He advertised the translation in the supplements of his newspapers and personally.

== Contents and origins ==
Constantinople-based N. Petrakides, a lawyer of Greek ethnicity, wrote the introduction. Editor Nicolaides wrote the dedication in both Ottoman Turkish and French. Different people wrote different sections, and Aristarchis himself did none of the actual translation. According to Johann Strauss, author of "A Constitution for a Multilingual Empire: Translations of the Kanun-ı Esasi and Other Official Texts into Minority Languages," seemingly none of the participants natively spoke French nor originated from France.

It has the Düstur in Volumes 1-5, with the fifth titled as Doustour-i-hamidié. British lawyer John Alexander Strachey Bucknill wrote that the second volume was "the French Paraphrase" of "The Imperial Penal Code". The corpus includes the Edict of Gülhane, originating from the 1865 collection Manuale di diritto publico e privato ottomano by Domenico Gatteschi, a lawyer from Italy's Supreme Court of Appeal. The book's translation of the Ottoman Reform Edict of 1856 (Islâhat Fermânı in modern Turkish) was made by French diplomat François Belin, who also attached his own notes; his translation was published first in the Journal Asiatique and later in his 1862 published book Etude sur la propriété foncière en pays musulman et spécialement en Turquie, as well as in the Manuale. Belin had also translated the Ottoman land codes used in this volume and included notes. However, the translation was on several occasions later revised to match the Greek version done by dragoman D. Rhazes, a translation Strauss stated had "such high esteem". Takvor Efendi Baghtchebanoglou, a judge at the criminal court of Péra (Beyoğlu) of Armenian descent, had hitherto published laws seen in volume 4 and 5 ("du Transport de Dette" and "du Gage", respectively).

The collection also has the Mecelle, in volumes 6–7. G. Sinapian, a scholar of Turkish studies and a jurist of Armenian descent, translated the eight chapters of the Mecelle in volume 7. For Livre des Preuves he used work by Ohannes Bey Alexanian as a basis.

L. Rota, a lawyer stated by Strauss to be "probably of Levantine origin" located in Constantinople, translated fourteen texts within the entire collection. Mihran Chirinian, an ethnic Armenian, and Alexander Adamides, an ethnic Greek, assisted him in the translations of content in volumes 1–3 and 5, and 6, respectively.

According to Strauss, as "Characteristically Greek is the treatment of Turkish" and in the initial section several technical words from Ottoman Turkish had been "almost slavishly [transcribed] from Greek", some translations in the collection in fact originated from Greek instead of Ottoman Turkish and were done by translators unaware of Ottoman Turkish conventions.

== Reception ==
D. G. Hogarth, in a review of Corps de droit ottoman for The English Historical Review, described Législation ottomane as "well-known" but also "as inaccurate as it is incomplete".

The Law Quarterly Review, also reviewing Corps de droit ottoman, stated that Législation ottomane was among the "best known" collections of Ottoman law.
