= Tanzimat =

Ottoman Empire reform period (1839–1876)

The Tanzimat (Note: Currently, in French, the word Tanzimat is used as a plural, as in Les Tanzimat. At the time, when French was a common language for the educated in the empire, the word was often treated in the singular, as Le Tanzimat.) (Ottoman Turkish: تنظيمات, Turkish: Tanzimât, lit. 'Reorganization') was a period of reforms in the Ottoman Empire that began with the Edict of Gülhane of 1839 and ended with the First Constitutional Era in 1876. Driven by reformist statesmen such as Mustafa Reşid Pasha, Mehmed Emin Âli Pasha, and Fuad Pasha, under Sultans Abdul Mejid and Abdul Aziz, the reforms sought to reverse the empire's decline by modernizing legal, military, and administrative systems while promoting Ottomanism (equality for all subjects). Though the secular Nizamiye Courts (Regular Courts), modern education, and infrastructure like railways, were introduced, the reforms faced resistance from conservative clerics, exacerbated ethnic tensions in the Balkans, and saddled the empire with crippling foreign debt. The Tanzimat's legacy remains contested: some historians credit it with establishing a powerful national government, while others argue it accelerated imperial fragmentation.

Different functions of government received reform, were completely reorganized, or started from scratch. Among institutions that received significant attention throughout this period included legislative functions, trade policy, secularization and codification of the legal system, crackdowns on the slave trade, education, property law, law enforcement, and the military. Ottoman statesmen also worked with reformers of the many confessional communities of the empire, millets, to codify — and in some cases democratize — their confessional governments.

The reforms of the Tanzimat built on previous reform efforts of Sultan Mahmud II. In its height, the Porte's bureaucracy overshadowed the sultans. After a period of chaos following Âlî Pasha's death in 1871, the spirit of reorganization turned towards the imperial social contract, in the form of the 1876 Ottoman Constitution, written by Midhat Pasha. The Tanzimat Period is considered to have ended with the chaos of the Great Eastern Crisis (1875–1878). However, reform efforts continued into the Hamidian, Young Turk, and One-Party period.

== Origins and purpose ==
Over the course of the 1700s, structural issues in Ottoman governance resulted in defeats in the Russo-Turkish Wars and the Greek War of Independence (1821–1830) and exposed the empire's inability to compete with European armies. Provincial governors (ayans) and local leaders (e.g., Muhammad Ali of Egypt) increasingly defied central authority. A period of cautious reform under Selim III (r. 1789–1807) resulted in the Nizam-i Cedid, or the New Order Movement, but conservatives and Janissaries revolted and installed Sultan Mahmud II after a series of coups. Mahmud II was a reform minded Sultan, but followed the lead of the conservatives until he could make his move in the Auspicious Incident in 1826, destroying the Janissaries. Mahmud II's reign from then on was a period of western reform and centralization.

By 1838 the Sublime Porte signed the Treaty of Balta Liman, with Britain, dismantling Ottoman trade monopolies and flooded markets with European goods.

On 1 July 1839, Mahmud II suddenly died and was succeeded by his son Abdul Mejid I. Reformists like Mustafa Reşid Pasha, who served as ambassador to London and Paris, argued that adopting European-style institutions could restore imperial power. Their ideas crystallized in the Gülhane Edict (1839) which was signed by the new Sultan, which promised: security of life, property, and honor for all subjects; fair taxation and conscription; public trials; and abolition of iltizam (tax farming).

== Motives ==
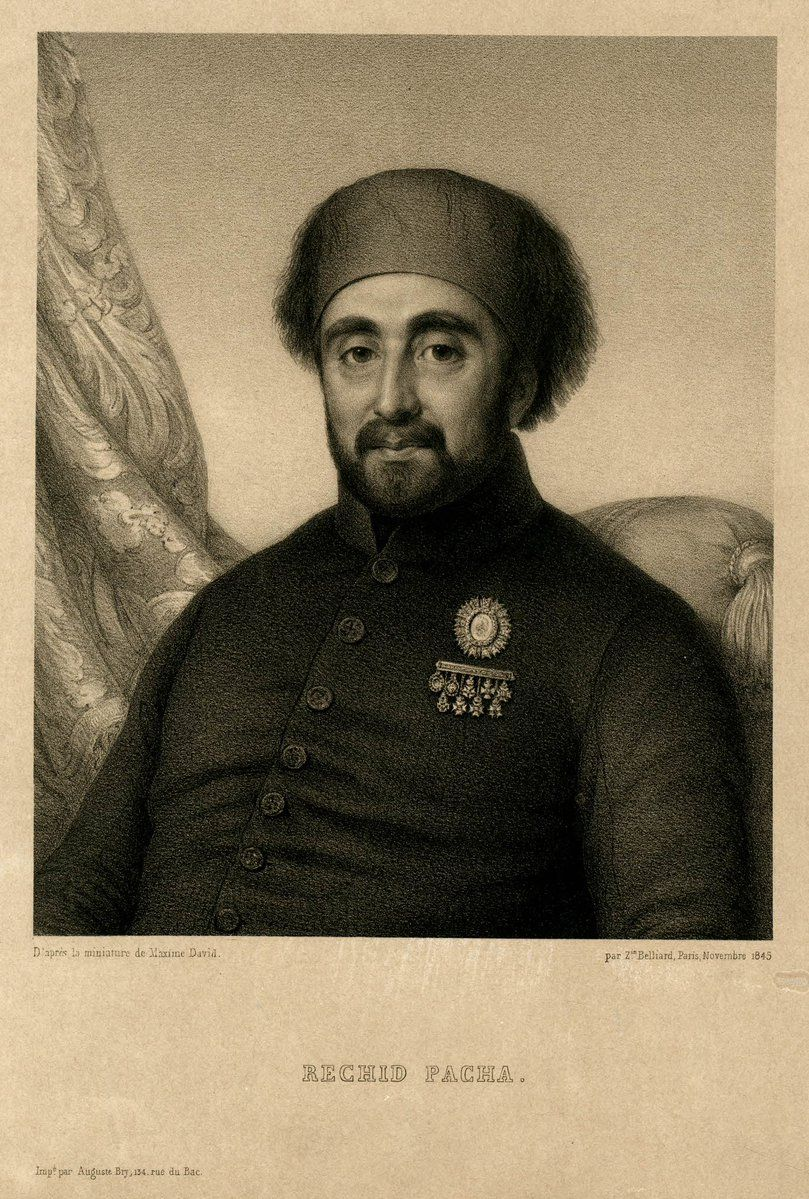
Mustafa Reşid Pasha, chief architect of the Tanzimat reform

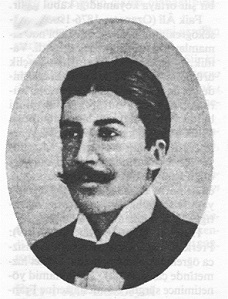
Cenab Şehabeddin was known for his liberal ideals and poetry influenced by French Symbolism.

The ambitious project was launched to combat the slow decline of the empire that had seen its borders shrink and its strength wane in comparison to the European powers. There were both internal and external reasons for the reforms.

The Edict of Gülhane was based on the principles of traditional court philosophy, with Butrus Abu-Manneh arguing that there was no Western influence in the edict; however, historian Stanford Jay Shaw suggests that the Gulhane Edict was directly influenced by the ideals codified by the 1789 French Declaration of the Rights of Man and the Citizen.

The primary purpose of the Tanzimat was to reform the military by modernizing and taking inspiration from European armies. The traditional Ottoman army, the Janissaries, had fallen from grace in terms of military prestige and a European-inspired reconstruction was considered a change that was necessary. The Ottoman Empire consisted of a multitude of different cultures and the secondary priorities of the Tanzimat reforms were aimed at balancing the social structure that had previously favoured Muslim subjects. Another vital section of these reforms was the abolition of İltizam, or land-tenure agreements.

Internally, reformists hoped that abolishing the millet system would create a more centralized government, as well as increased legitimacy of the Ottoman rule, thus gaining direct control of its citizens. Non-Muslims were partially governed by their ethnarchs or received berats of protection from foreign countries. Another major hope was that being more open to various demographics would attract more people into the empire. There was fear of internal strife between Muslims and non-Muslims, and allowing more religious freedom to all was supposed to diminish this threat. Giving more rights to the Christians within the empire was considered likely to reduce the danger of outside intervention on their behalf.

Liberal ministers and intellectuals contributed to reform like Dimitrios Zambakos Pasha, Kabuli Mehmed Pasha, the secret society of the Young Ottomans, and Midhat Pasha. During the Great Eastern Crisis in the 1870s, government ministers led by Midhat Pasha conspired to overthrow Sultan Abdul Aziz in a coup and introduce a constitution. This began the First Constitutional Era, which many historians agree represents the end of the Tanzimat, even though reform continued uninterrupted at its end in 1878, and then into the Hamidian Era.

Examples of dress reform
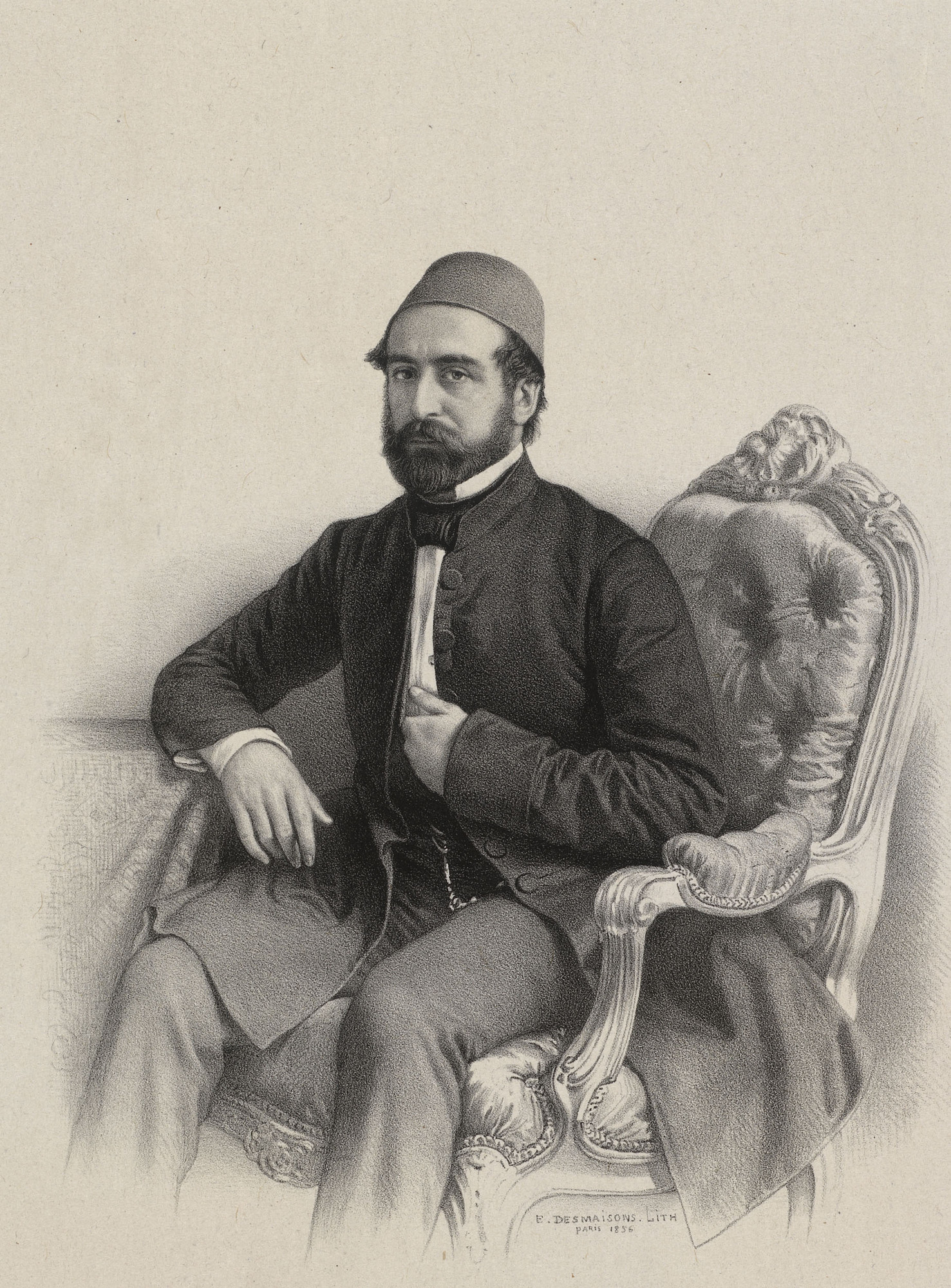
Diplomat Mehmed Cemil Bey wearing a frock coat and a bow tie.

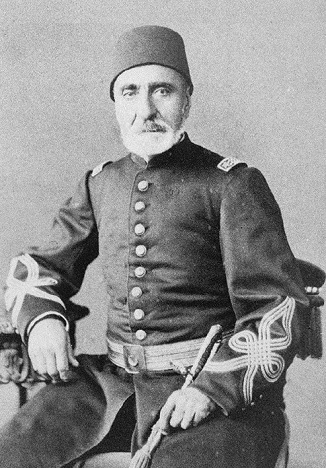
Necip Ahmed Pasha, career officer and composer in French-inspired uniform.

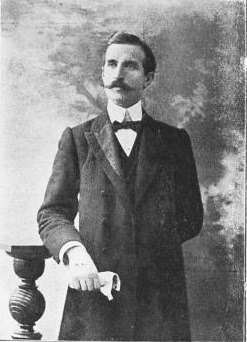
Governor Rahmi Bey

Mehmed Galip Bey Efendi

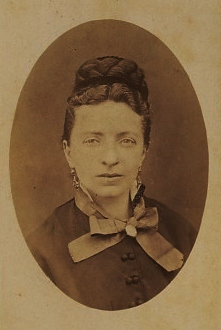
Gülüstü Hanım

Şayeste Hanım

== Reforms ==
Key Tanzimat Edicts
Edict	Year	Key Provisions
Edict of Gülhane	1839	Abolished tax farming; guaranteed security of life, property, and honor.
Imperial Reform Edict	1856	Full legal equality for non-Muslims; reformed provincial councils.

On November 3, 1839, Sultan Abdulmejid I issued a hatt-i sharif, or imperial edict, called the Edict of Gülhane. The edict gave guarantees to ensure the Ottoman subjects perfect security for their lives, honour, and property. This was followed by several statutes enacting its policies. In the edict the Sultan stated that he wished "to bring the benefits of a good administration to the provinces of the Ottoman Empire through new institutions". The following reforms came about during the Tanzimat period:

- Establishment of the Ministry of Trade and Agriculture (1839)
- Introduction of the first Ottoman paper banknotes (1840)
- Establishment of the Ministry of Post and the first post offices of the empire (1840)
- Reorganization of the finance system (1840)
- Reorganization of the Civil and Penal Code (1840)
- The Council of Public Education (Meclis-i Maarif-i Umumiye) was established in (1841) as part of the Tanzimat reforms to regulate and modernize the Ottoman educational system. The council played a crucial role in overseeing primary schools and initiating the foundation of higher education institutions like Darülfünun (House of Sciences).
- Reorganization of the army and a regular method of recruiting, levying the army, and fixing the duration of military service (1843–44)
- Redesign of Ottoman national anthem and Ottoman national flag (1844)
- First nationwide Ottoman census in 1844 (only male citizens were counted)
- First national identity cards (officially named the Mecidiye identity papers, or informally kafa kağıdı (head paper) documents, 1844)
- Establishment of a few provincial councils (meclis) attached to governors, a system which soon spread to the rest of the empire (1845)
- Institution of a Council of Public Instruction (1845) and the Ministry of Education (Mekatib-i Umumiye Nezareti, 1847, which later became the Maarif Nezareti, 1857)
- Recognition of the Chaldean Catholic Millet (1846)
- Disestablishment of the Istanbul Slave Market (1847)
- Suppression of the slave trade in the Persian Gulf (1847)
- Recognition of the Protestant Millet (1847)
- Establishment of the first telegraph networks (1847–1855) and railway networks (1856)
- Establishment of the first modern universities (darülfünun, 1848), academies (1848) and teacher schools (darülmuallimin, 1848)
- Establishment of the Ministry of Healthcare (Tıbbiye Nezareti, 1850)
- Promulgation of the Commerce and Trade Code (1850)
- Coinciding with the Commerce Code, the establishment of commercial courts composed of mixed Turkish and European members, the first secular legal system in the Ottoman Empire (1850)
- Establishment of the Academy of Sciences (Encümen-i Daniş) (1851)
- Establishment of the Şirket-i Hayriye which operated the first steam-powered commuter ferries (1851)
- Reorganization of the Penal Code (1851)
- Prohibition of the Circassian and Georgian slave trade (1854–1855)
- Legislative functions of the Supreme Council of Judicial Ordinances (Meclis-i Vâlâ-yı Ahkâm-ı Adliye) passed to the Council of Reorganization (Meclis-i Âli-i Tanzimat) (1854)
- First foreign loan borrowed from Britain to finance the Crimean War (1858)
- Establishment of the modern Municipality of Constantinople (Şehremaneti, 1854) and the City Planning Council (İntizam-ı Şehir Komisyonu, 1855)
- The Imperial Reform Edict of 1856 promising full legal equality for citizens of all religions. Abolition of Jizya, though it was replaced with bedel-i askeri, and iltizams –tax farms (1856)
- Establishment of the Ottoman Bank (originally established as the Bank-ı Osmanî in 1856, and later reorganized as the Bank-ı Osmanî-i Şahane in 1863) and the Ottoman Stock Exchange (Dersaadet Tahvilat Borsası, established in 1866)
- Permission for private sector publishers and printing firms with the Serbesti-i Kürşad Nizamnamesi (1857)
- Prohibition of the Black Slave Trade (1857)
- Codification and promulgation of the Land Code (1858)
- Promulgation of a western-inspired Penal Code (which included the decriminalization of homosexuality), replacing the 1851 codex, which endured until 1928 (1858)
- Establishment of the School of Civil Service, an institution of higher learning for civilians under the Ministry of Internal Affairs, and the School of Economical and Political Sciences (Mekteb-i Mülkiye-i Şahane) (1859)
- Internal security duties of the office of Grand Vizier passed to a new Ministry of the Interior (1860)
- Recognition of the Bulgarian Catholic Millet (1860)
- Establishment of the Refugee Commission (Mihacirin Komisyonu) to resettle refugees from the Caucasus, which built on the Immigration Law of 1857 (1860)
- Promulgation of a French inspired Mixed Commercial Code (1861)
- Merging of the Supreme Council of Judicial Ordinances and Council of Reorganization (1861)
- Establishment of the Mount Lebanon Mutasarrifate (1861)
- Issuance of kaime, paper currency (1862)
- Promulgation of basic laws for the Greek Millet (1862)
- Establishment of a supreme comptroling authority in the Court of Accounts (Divan-ı Ali-i Muhâsebât), (1862)
- Promulgation of a French inspired Maritime Commerce Code (1863)
- Promulgation of a Constitution for the Armenian Millet and the Armenian National Assembly (1863)
- Promulgation of a Press and Journalism Regulation Code (Matbuat Nizamnamesi) (1864)
- Reorganization of provincial administration with the Vilayet Law (1864)
- Establishment of the secular Nizamiye Courts (1864)
- Promulgation of a Constitution for the Jewish Millet and a Jewish National Assembly (1865)
- Governance over Sufi Orders handed to the ulema with the establishment of the Assembly of Shaykhs (Meclis-i Meşayıh) under the Şeyhülislam, (1866)
- Reorganization of waqf, or Islamic mortmain property (1867)
- Regulation of foreigners on owning Ottoman property, effectively weakening capitulation treaties (1867)
- Establishment of the Ministry of Naval Affairs (1867)
- Promulgation of the Mining Code (1867)
- Supreme Council of Judicial Ordinances (Meclis-i Vâlâ-yı Ahkâm-ı Adliye) split into a Council of State and a Supreme Court of Cassation (and appeals) (Dîvân-ı Ahkâm-ı Adliyye) (1868)
- Establishment of Galatasaray High School (Imperial Ottoman Lycée at Galatasaray), another institution of higher learning for civilians (1868);
- Nationality Law creating a common Ottoman citizenship irrespective of religious divisions, another attack on capitulations and the berat system (1869)
- Establishment of the Ottoman Gendarmerie (1869)
- Publication of a Hanefite-Sharia civil code: the Mecelle, which endured until 1926 in Turkey and beyond in other post-Ottoman states (1869–1876)
- Reorganization of the judiciary of the Muslim millet (1869)
- Establishment of the Bulgarian Exarchate and the Bulgarian millet (1872)
- Due to Mahmud Nedim Pasha's absolutist agenda, the power of the Council of State reduced at the expense of the Judicial Council and a new Reform Commission (Islahat Komisyonu) and a Reduction and Economy Commission to streamline the bureaucracy (Tensikat ve Tasarrufat Komisyonu). Midhat Pasha's entry to the Grand Vizier's office sees these commissions quickly repealed, and the Council of State restored to its powers, and then some. (1872)
- Recognition of the Syriac Orthodox Millet (1873)
- Adoption of the metric system (1875)
- Promulgation of an Ottoman Constitution, Senate, and Chamber of Deputies after the 1876 revolution (1876)

=== Edict of Gülhane of 1839 ===
The Hatt-ı Şerif of Gülhane, was the first major reform in the Tanzimat reforms under the government of sultan Abdulmejid and a crucial event in the movement towards secularization. The decree, named after the rosehouse (gülhane) on the grounds of the Topkapi Palace, abolished tax farming. It also created a bureaucratic system of taxation with salaried tax collectors. This reflects the centralizing effects of the Tanzimat reforms. Additionally, the Edict of Gülhane imposed forced military conscription within the administrative districts based on their population size.

However, the most significant clause of the Gülhane decree was the one enforcing the rule of law for all subjects, including non-Muslims, by guaranteeing the right to life and property for all. This put an end to the kul system, which allowed the ruler's servants to be executed or have their property confiscated at his desire. These reforms sought to establish legal and social equality for all Ottoman citizens. The reforms et spiritus eliminated the millet system in the Ottoman Empire. The millet system created religiously based communities that operated autonomously, so people were organized into societies, some of them often receiving privileges. This clause terminated the privileges of these communities and constructed a society where all followed the same law.

The new reforms called for an almost complete reconstruction of public life in the Ottoman Empire. Under the reconstruction, a system of state schools was established to produce government clerics. Ottomans were encouraged to enroll. Each province was organized so that each governor would have an advisory council and specified duties in order to better serve the territory. The new reforms also called for a modern financial system with a central bank, treasury bonds and a decimal currency. Finally, the reforms implemented the expansion of roads, canals and rail lines for better communication and transportation.

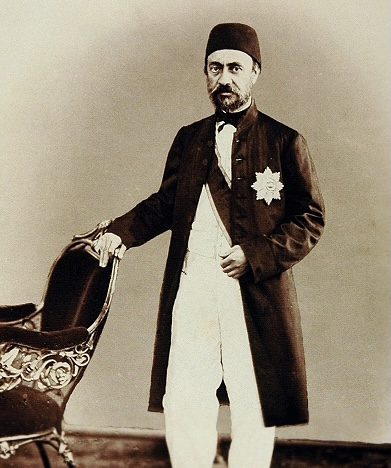
Mehmed Emin Âli Pasha, the principal architect of the Imperial Reform Edict of 1856.

=== Reactions ===
The reaction to the edict was not entirely positive. Christians in the Balkans refused to support the reforms because they wanted an autonomy that became more difficult to achieve under centralized power. In fact, its adoption spurred some provinces to seek independence by rebelling. It took strong British backing in maintaining Ottoman territory to ensure that the reforms were instated.

=== Edict of 1856 and religious freedom ===
The Reform Edict of 1856 was intended to carry out the promises of the Tanzimat. The Edict is very specific about the status of non-Muslims, making it possible "to see it as the outcome of a period of religious restlessness that followed the Edict of 1839". Officially, part of the Tanzimat's goal was to make the state intolerant to forced conversion to Islam, also making the execution of apostates from Islam illegal. Despite the official position of the state in the midst of the Tanzimat reforms, this tolerance of non-Muslims seems to have been seriously curtailed, at least until the Reform Edict of 1856. The Ottoman Empire had tried many different ways to reach out to non-Muslims. First it tried to reach out to them by giving all non-Muslims an option to apply for Dhimmi status. Having Dhimmi status gave non-Muslims the ability to live in the Ottoman Empire and own property, but this ability was not without special taxes (jizya).

For the "Ottoman ruling elite, 'freedom of religion' meant 'freedom to defend their religion'".

=== Legal reforms ===
The Tanzimat introduced secular law codes to replace traditional sharia-based jurisprudence:

- 1858 Ottoman Penal Code: Modeled on France's Napoleonic Code, it abolished punishments like limb amputation for theft, replacing them with fines and prison terms. Religious courts retained control over family law.
- Commercial Code (1850): Standardized trade laws to attract European investors but weakened Ottoman guilds, leading to artisanal protests in cities like Bursa.

== Challenges and opposition ==
The Tanzimat reforms faced significant resistance from multiple groups and unintended consequences that undermined their goals.

=== Financial crisis ===
Foreign loans for infrastructure (e.g., £200 million borrowed from British and French banks by 1875) led to bankruptcy in 1875. In 1881, European powers established the Ottoman Public Debt Administration to control revenue streams like tobacco taxes.

=== Ethnic and religious tensions ===
Reforms failed to curb separatist movements especially in the Balkans. The 1875 Herzegovina Uprising was partly fueled by tax grievances among Christian peasants. The 1856 Imperial Reform Edict mandated military service for non-Muslims, but exemptions could be purchased with bedl-i askeri, leading to resentment among poorer Christians. In practice however Christians were not expected to serve in the Ottoman army, with the door only opening for their service in 1909.

=== Conservative backlash ===
Conservative clerics opposed secular courts and schools, fearing the erosion of Islamic authority. Muslim peasants and artisans resented losing tax exemptions and competing with European goods. While a theme of Tanzimat reform was introducing secular law to aspects of life, Muslim conservatives won a victory through civil law codification through the introduction of the Mecelle, a Hanefi-Sharia code adapted for a modern bureaucracy.

=== Backlash from bureaucracy ===
While the Tanzimat is often portrayed as a top-down reform movement, there was significant resistance from within the Ottoman bureaucracy. Some conservative officials formed secret committees to oppose reforms, particularly those that threatened their privileges. For example, the "Halet Efendi Faction" (a group of conservative elites) actively worked to undermine early Tanzimat policies before being purged by Sultan Mahmud II.

== Principal men of the Tanzimat ==
Offices held by the principal men of the Tanzimat, 1836–1876
Year	Mustafa Reşid Pasha	Mehmed Emin Âlî Pasha	Mehmed Fuad Pasha
1839	Foreign minister, 1837–1841		
1840	Ambassador to Paris, 1840–1845		First translator of the Porte, 1838–1852
1841		Ambassador to London, 1841–1844	
1842			
1843			
1844		Member of the Supreme Council of Judicial Ordinances, 1844–1846	
1845			
1846	Grand Vizier, 1846–1848	Foreign minister, 1846–1848	
1847			
1848		Foreign minister, 1848–1852	
1849			
1850			
1851			
1852	Grand Vizier, 1852	Grand Vizier, 1852	Foreign minister, 1852 Member of the Council of Reorganization, 1852–1855
1853	Foreign minister, 1853–1854		
1854	Grand Vizier, 1854–1855	Foreign minister, 1854–1855	
1855		Grand Vizier, 1855–1856	Foreign minister, 1855–1856
1856	Grand Vizier, 1856–1857	Foreign minister, 1856–1858	Chairman of the Council of Reorganization, 1856–1858
1857	Grand Vizier, 1857–1858		
1858	Died, 1858	Grand Vizier, 1858–1859	Foreign minister, 1858–1860
1859		Chairman of the Council of Reorganization, 1859–1861	
1860			
1861			Grand Vizier, 1861–1863
1862			
1863			Grand Vizier, 1863–1866
1864			
1865			
1866			
1867		Grand Vizier, 1867–1871	Foreign minister, 1867–1869
1868			
1869			Died, 1869
1870			
1871		Died, 1871	

== Impacts ==
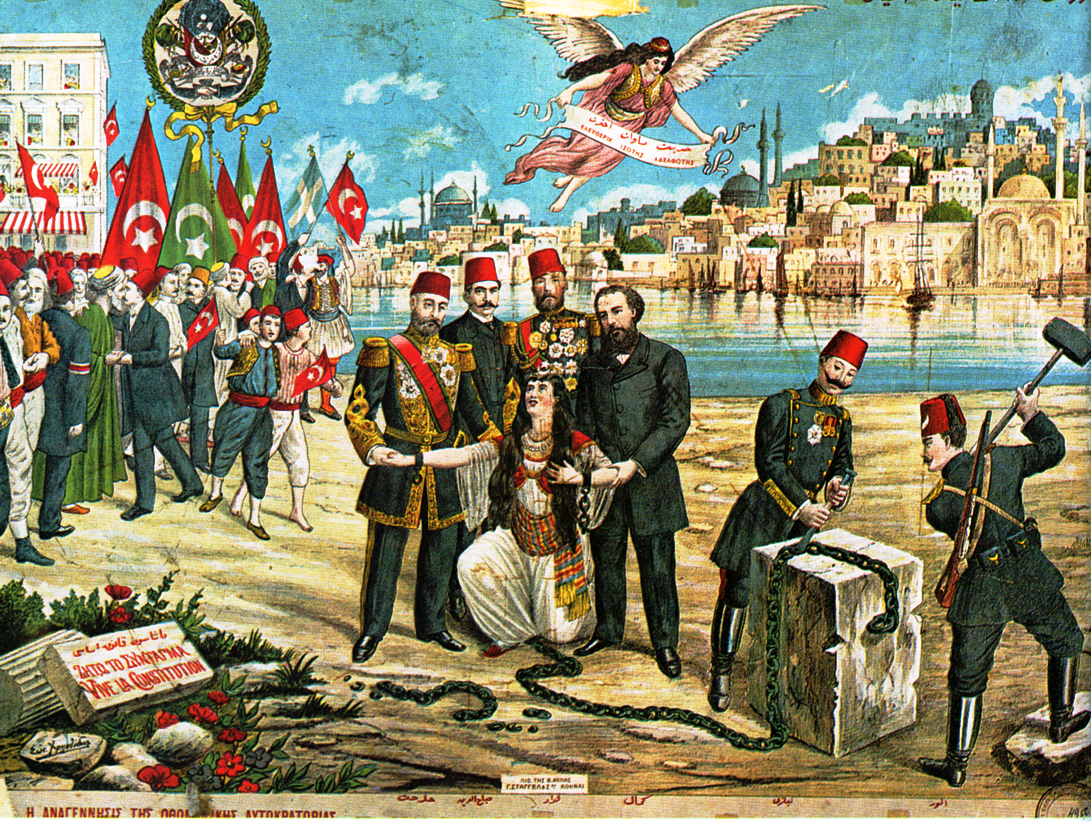
The 1876 Constitution: Midhat Pasha, Prince Sabahaddin, Fuad Pasha, Namık Kemal, and the millets grant freedom to an idealized female figure representing Turkey, whose chains are being smashed by military leaders Niyazi Bey and Enver Pasha. The flying angel displays a banner with the motto of the French Revolution: Liberty, Equality, Fraternity in Turkish (Perso-Arabic script) and in Greek. The scene takes place in a generic Bosphorus scenery. Reproduced from a 1908 lithograph celebrating the re-introduction of the constitution thanks to the Young Turk Revolution of 1908.

Although the Edict of Gülhane and the Tanzimat provided strong guidelines for society, they were not a constitution and did not replace the authority of the sultan.

Still, the Tanzimat reforms had far-reaching effects overall. Those educated in the schools established during the Tanzimat period included major personalities of the nation states that would develop from the Ottoman Empire. The system was ultimately undone by negotiations with the Great Powers following the Crimean War. As part of the Charter of 1856, European powers demanded a much stronger sovereignty for ethnic communities within the empire, differing from the Ottomans, who envisioned equality meaning identical treatment under the law for all citizens. That served to strengthen the Christian middle class, increasing their economic and political power.

The reforms peaked in 1876 with the implementation of an Ottoman constitution checking the autocratic powers of the Sultan. The details of this period are covered under the First Constitutional Era. Although the new Sultan Abdul Hamid II signed the first constitution, he quickly turned against it.

Historian Hans-Lukas Kieser has argued that the reforms led to "the rhetorical promotion of equality of non-Muslims with Muslims on paper vs. the primacy of Muslims in practice" (see Tanzimat Dualism); other historians have argued that the decreased ability of non-Muslims to assert their legal rights during this period led to the land seizure and emigration. Part of the reform policy was an economic policy based on the Treaty of Balta Liman of 1838. Many changes were made to improve civil liberties, but many Muslims saw them as a foreign influence on the world of Islam. That perception complicated reformist efforts made by the state. During the Tanzimat period, the government's series of constitutional reforms led to a fairly modern conscripted army, banking system reforms, the replacement of religious law with secular law and guilds with modern factories.

Some scholars argue that from the Muslim population's traditional Islamic view, the Tanzimat's fundamental change regarding non-Muslims, from a status of a subjugated population (dhimmi) to that of equal subjects, was in part responsible for the Hamidian massacres and subsequent Armenian genocide. According to this view, the government's allocation of more equality to non-Muslims conflicted with the Muslim's population's traditional values, thereby spurring violent reactions. By the mid-19th century, approximately 35% of the Ottoman Empire's population was non-Muslim.

=== Effects in different provinces ===
In Lebanon, the Tanzimat reforms were intended to return to the tradition of equality for all subjects before the law. However, the Sublime Porte assumed that the underlying hierarchical social order would remain unchanged. Instead, the upheavals of reform would allow for different understandings of the goals of the Tanzimat. The elites in Mount Lebanon, in fact, interpreted the Tanzimat far differently from one another, leading to ethno-religious uprisings among newly emancipated Maronites. As a result, "European and Ottoman officials engaged in a contest to win the loyalty of the local inhabitants — the French by claiming to protect the Maronites; the British, the Druze; and the Ottomans by proclaiming the sultan's benevolence toward all his religiously equal subjects."

In Palestine, land reforms, especially the change in land ownership structure via the Ottoman Land Law of 1858, allowed Russian and Yemeni Jews to buy land, thus enabling them to immigrate there under the first Aliya. In order to boost its tax base, the Ottoman state required Arabs in Palestine, as elsewhere, to register their lands for the first time. As a rule the fellahin didn't trust the ailing regime, fearing that registration would only lead to higher taxation and conscription. Prevailing illiteracy among the fellahin meant in the end that many local mukhtars were able to collectively register village lands under their own name. Thus, they were able to later claim ownership and to sell the local peasants' lands out from under their feet to the new Jewish immigrants, as they themselves relocated permanently to Syria or Turkey. Alternately, rich Christian or Muslim families, the class of the 'Effendis', were able to accumulate large amounts of land which they exploited by themselves or sold on.

In 1863 the Armenian National Constitution was approved by the Ottoman government. The "Code of Regulations" consisted of 150 articles drafted by the Armenian intelligentsia and defined the powers of the Armenian Patriarch under the Ottoman millet system and the newly formed Armenian National Assembly.

=== Political consequences ===
The Tanzimat reforms, though designed to stabilize and modernize the Ottoman Empire, had profound and often destabilizing political consequences that reshaped the empire's trajectory in the 19th century.

==== Centralization and resistance ====
The reforms sought to centralize power in Istanbul, dismantling the autonomy of provincial elites (ayans) and religious leaders. This provoked rebellions in regions such as:

- Bosnia Vilayet (1850–1851): Local leaders resisted Istanbul's authority.
- Mount Lebanon Mutasarrifate (1860 Druze–Maronite conflict): Religious and local factions rejected Ottoman rule.

Even efforts to modernize infrastructure, such as railways, were perceived as tools of imperial control, deepening distrust in the provinces.

==== Fragmentation of Ottoman Identity ====
While the Tanzimat promoted Ottomanism (equality for all subjects regardless of religion), it inadvertently accelerated ethnic and religious separatism. In the Balkans, Christian communities leveraged new legal rights to demand autonomy, culminating in:

- The 1875 Herzegovina Uprising
- The 1877–1878 Russo-Turkish War

Conversely, Muslim elites resented perceived Christian favoritism, fueling pan-Islamic movements under Sultan Abdul Hamid II (r. 1876–1909).

==== Foreign exploitation and territorial loss ====
European powers exploited the Tanzimat's rhetoric of minority rights to justify intervention. The Treaty of Berlin (1878), following the Ottoman defeat in the Russo-Turkish War, formalized the loss of Bulgaria, Bosnia, and Cyprus. Additionally, France and Britain gained oversight over Ottoman reforms, further undermining imperial sovereignty.

==== Internal power struggles ====
Reformist bureaucrats, such as the Young Ottomans, clashed with conservative clerics and Sultan Abdulaziz (r. 1861–1876), who suspended the 1876 Constitution within two years. This cycle of reform and repression radicalized factions like the Committee of Union and Progress (Young Turks), whose 1908 revolution ended Abdul Hamid II's autocracy but failed to salvage the empire.

=== Scholarly perspectives ===
Zeynep Çelik summarizes the Tanzimat's paradox:

From 1838 to 1908, the Ottoman Empire staged its final but doomed struggle for survival. The Tanzimat’s dual allegiance to Western progress and Islamic tradition left it alienating both reformers and traditionalists, accelerating its disintegration.

== Gallery ==
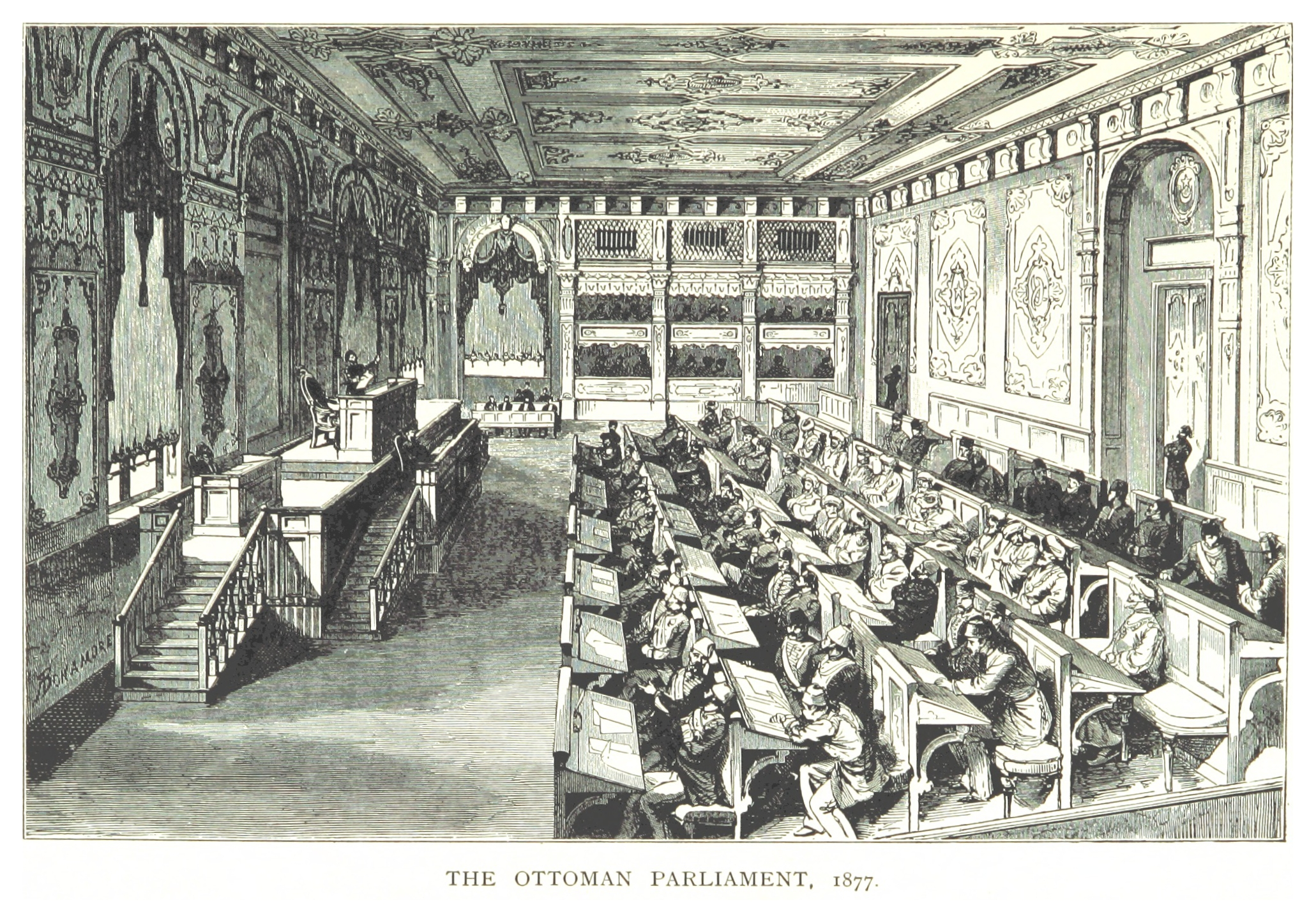
Meeting of the Parliament, 1877.

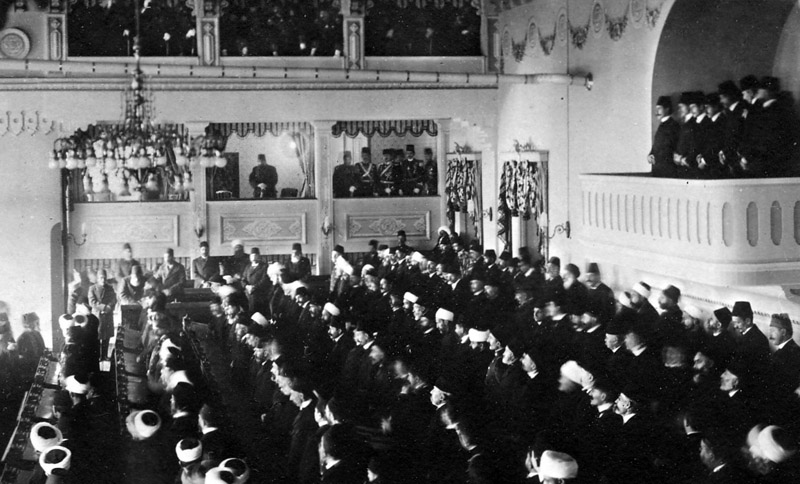
Meeting of the Parliament, 1908.

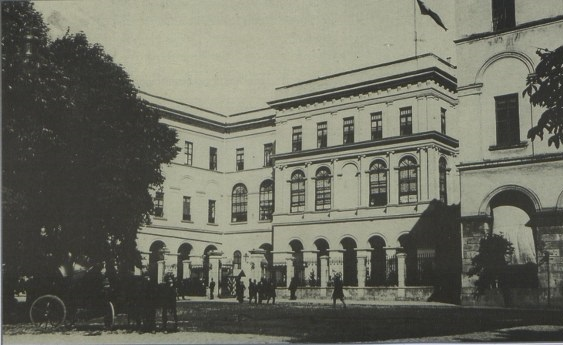
Building of the Ottoman Parliament.

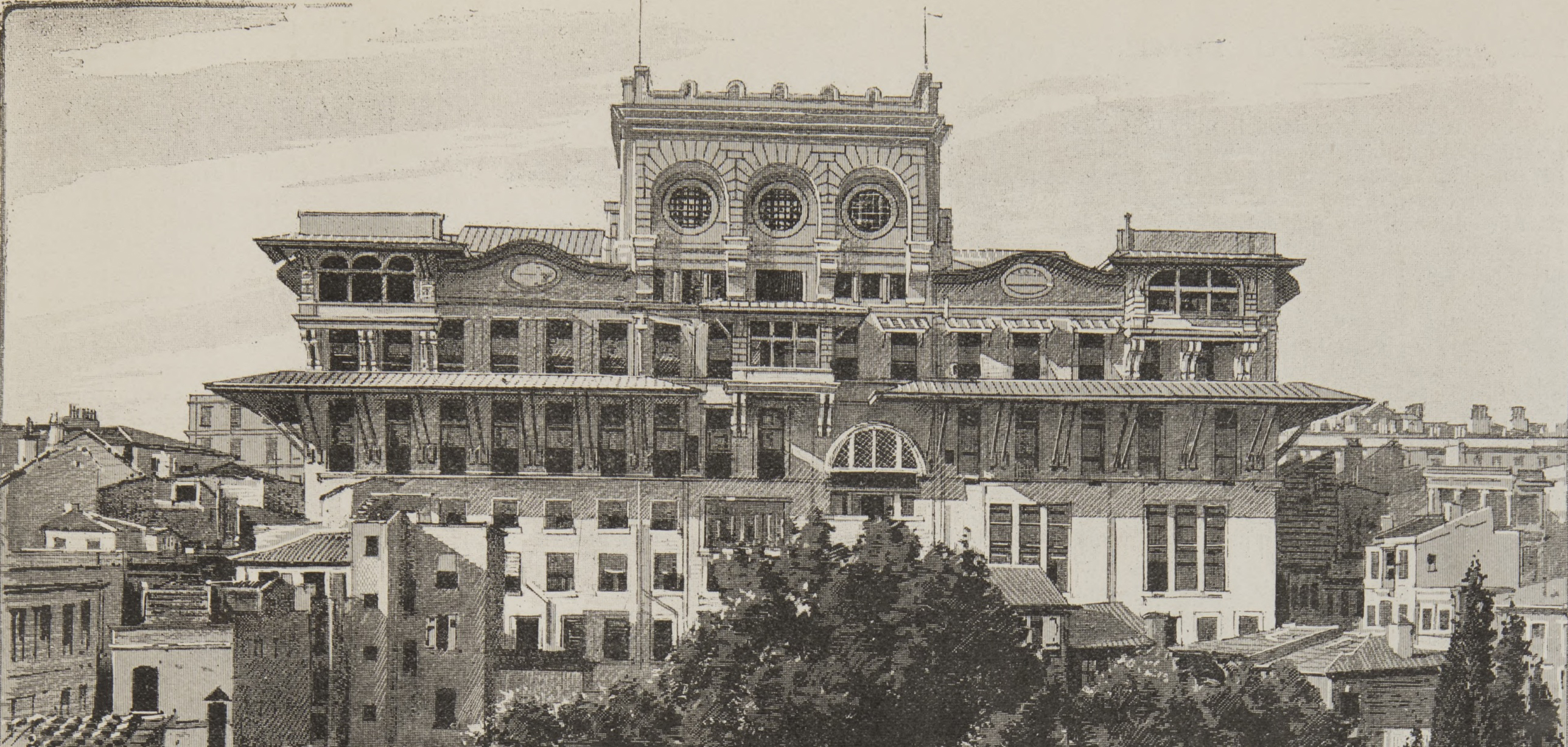
The Imperial Ottoman Bank headquarters, 1896.

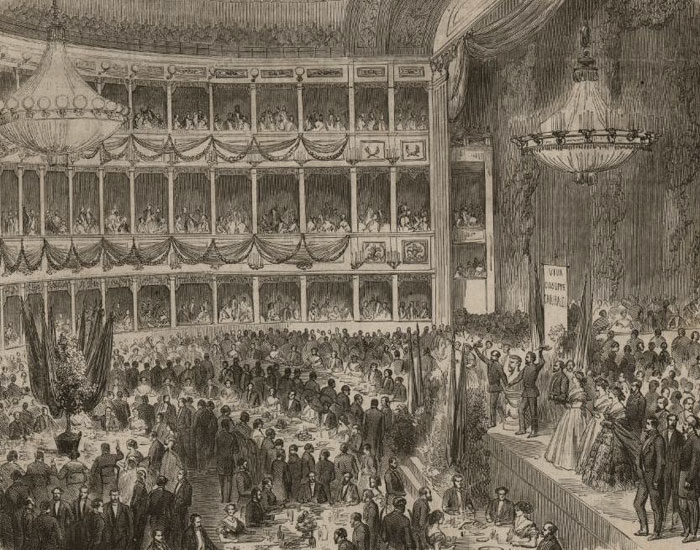
Naum Theatre in Constantinople.

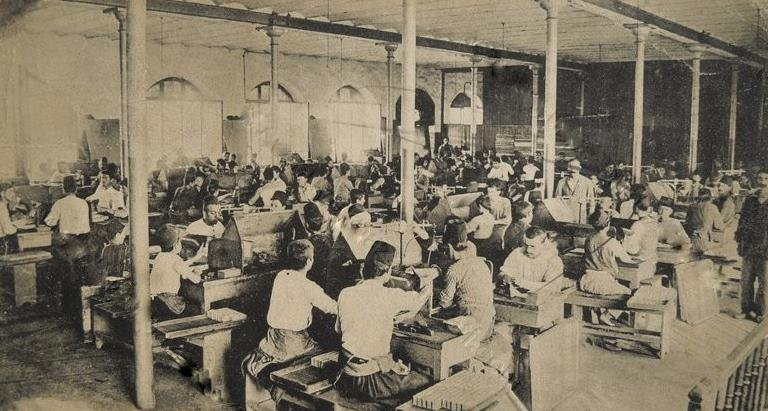
Tobacco factory in Samsun, 1910.

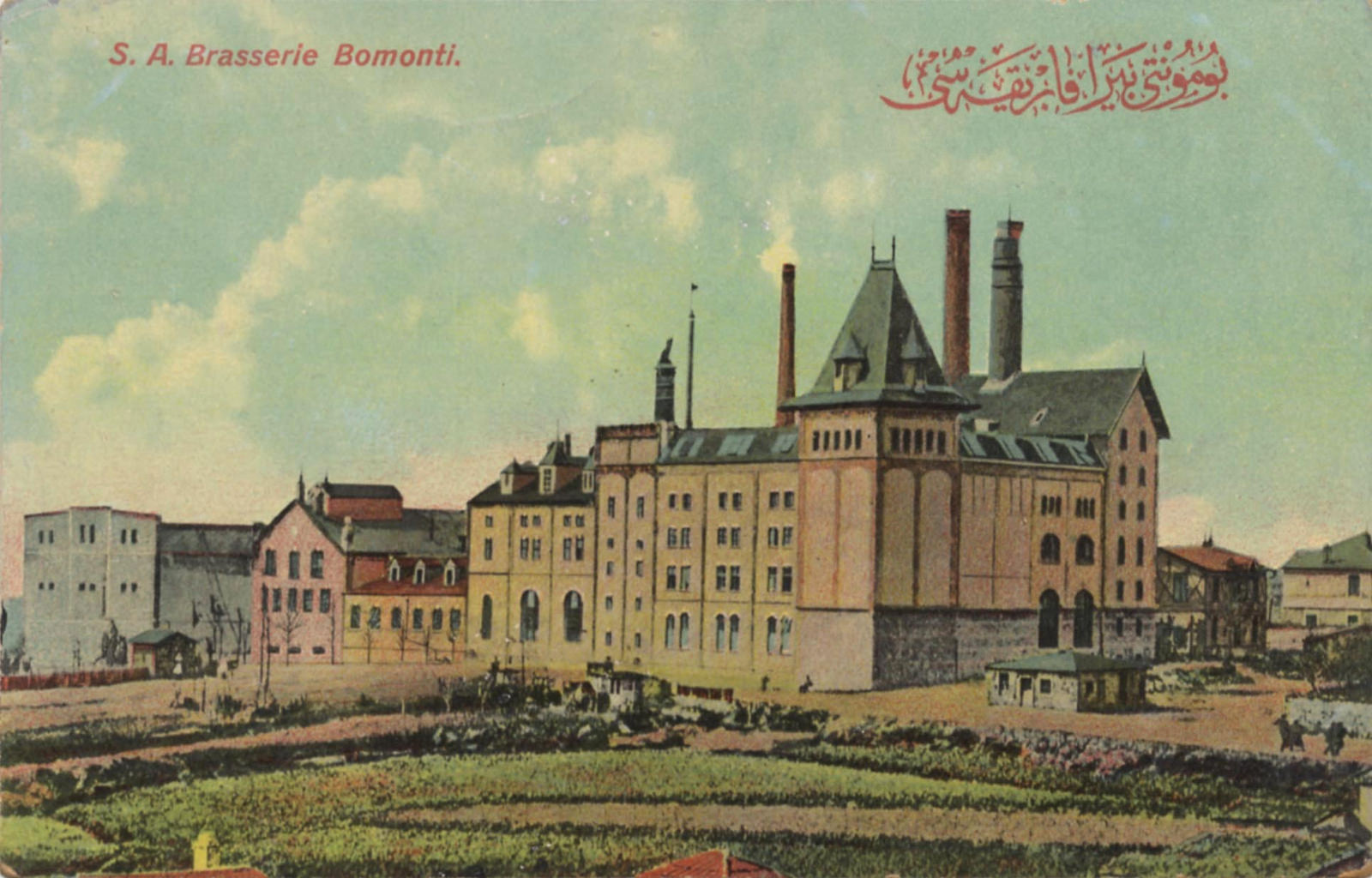
Bomonti brewery of Constantinople.

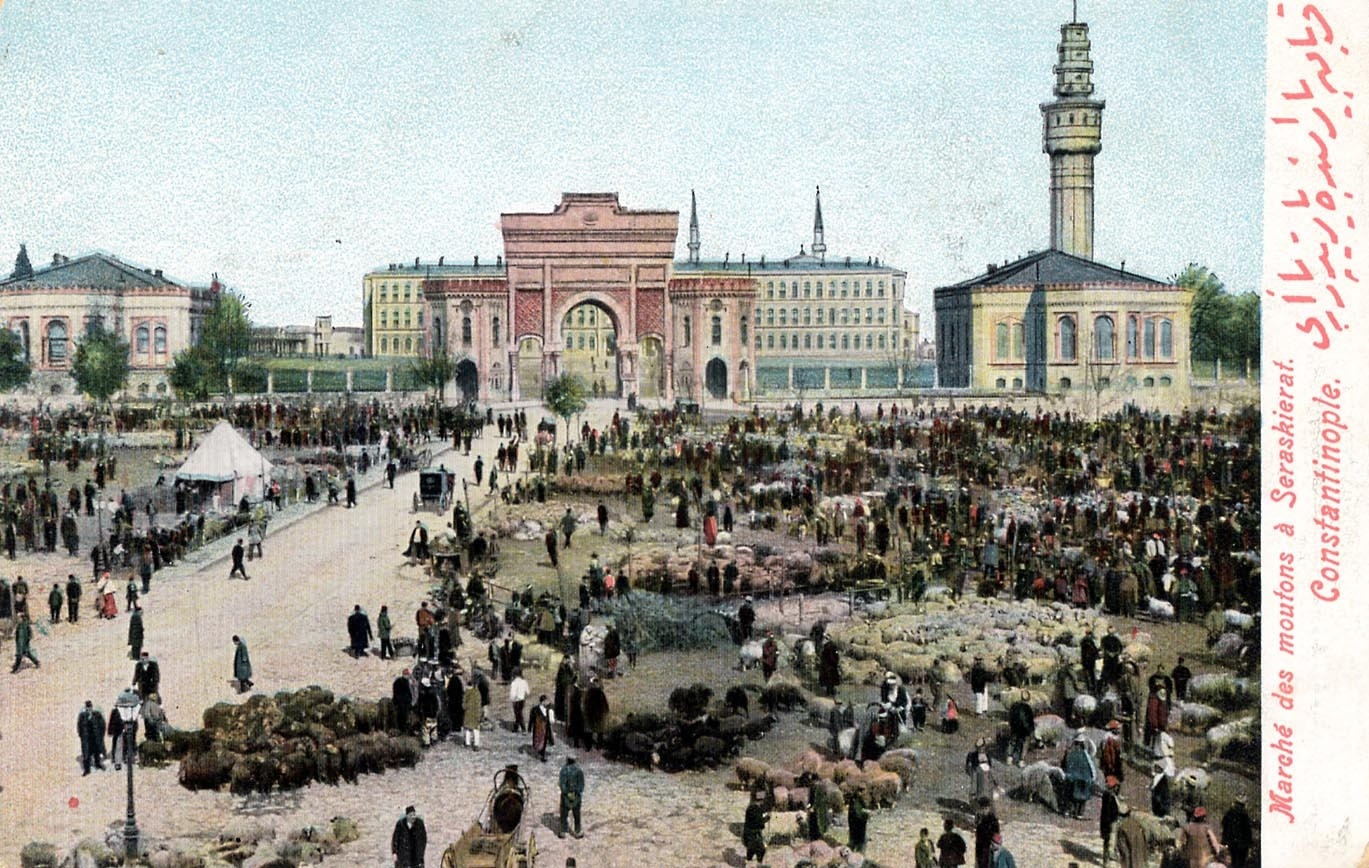
Beyazıt Square, 1880s.

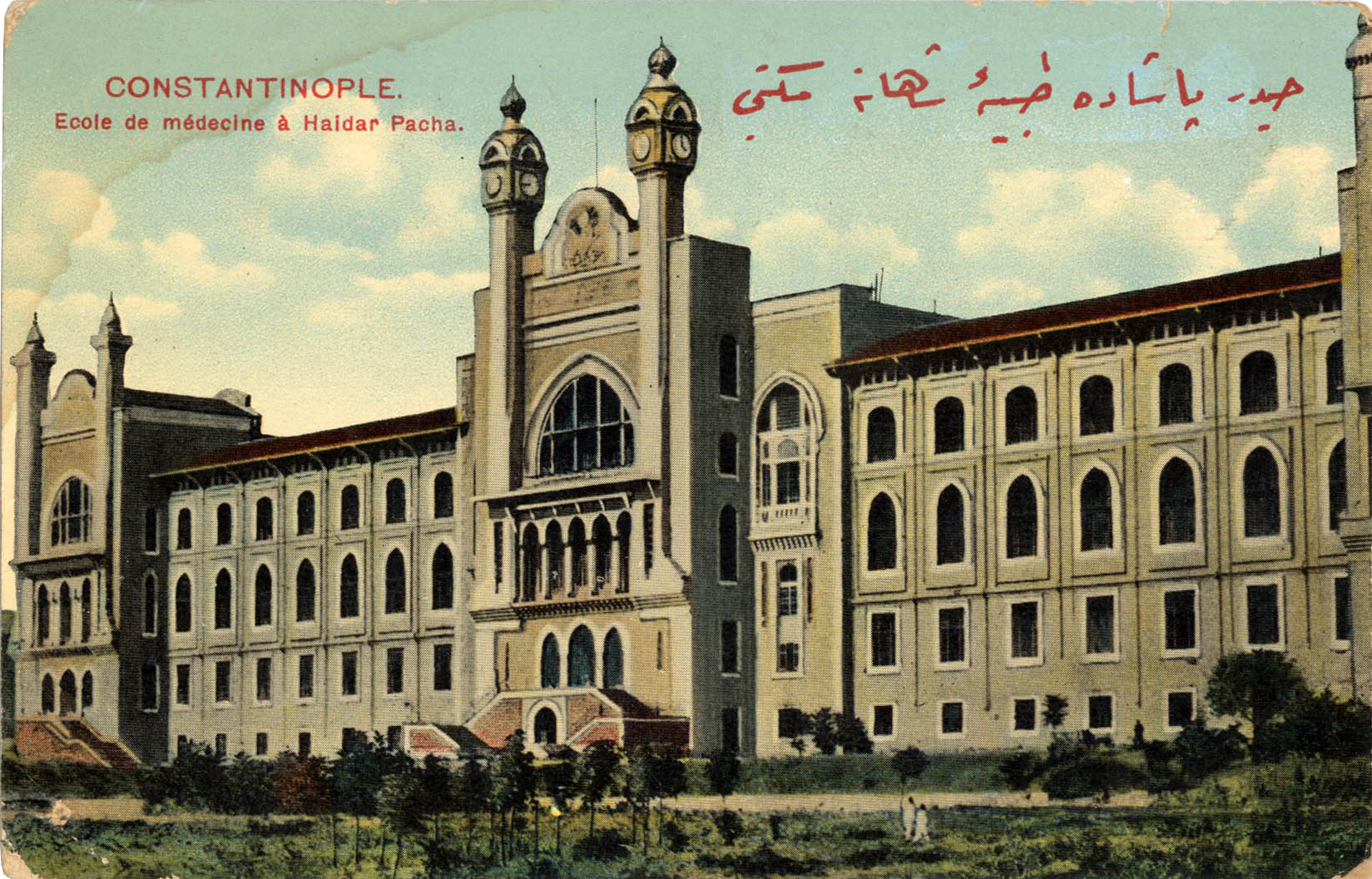
Marmara University, 1880s.

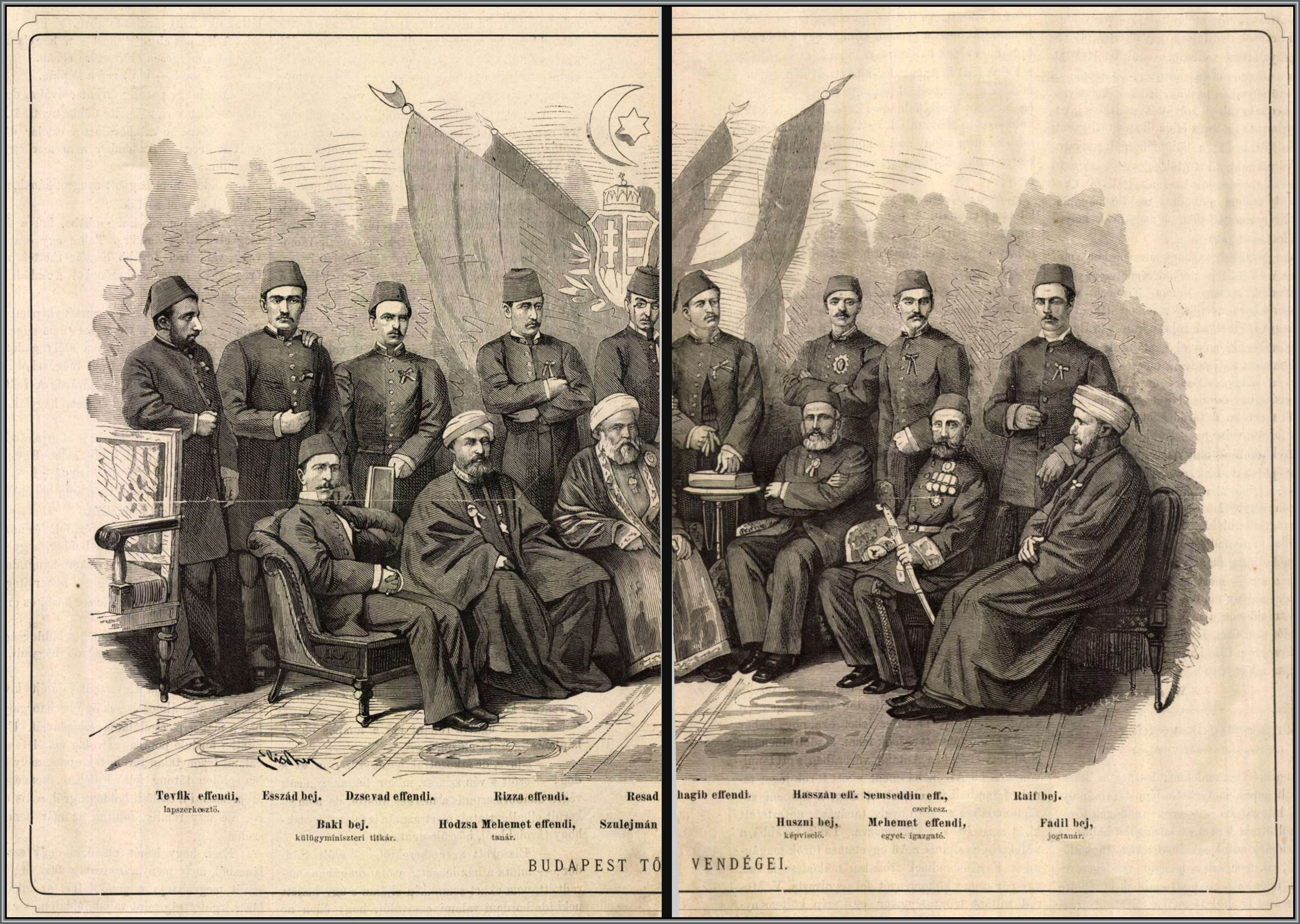
Turkish delegates to Budapest

== See also ==
- Decline and modernization of the Ottoman Empire
- Ottoman military reforms
- Young Ottomans
- Court uniform and dress in the Ottoman Empire
- Düstür
- Ahmed Cevdet Pasha

== Cited sources ==
- Cleveland, William L.; Bunton, Martin P. (4 December 2012). A history of the modern Middle East (Fifth ed.). Boulder, CO. ISBN 978-0-8133-4833-9. OCLC 813691473.
- Davison, Roderic (1963), Reform in the Ottoman Empire: 1856–1876, Princeton, New Jersey: Princeton University Press
- Shaw, Stanford; Shaw, Ezel (1977). History of the Ottoman Empire and Modern Turkey. Vol. II. Cambridge University Press. ISBN 0-521-29166-6.
