= Liberalism in Turkey =

Liberalism was first introduced in the Ottoman Empire during the Tanzimat period (1839–1876) of reformation, following the Edict of Gülhane in 1839. The reforms encouraged Ottomanism among the diverse ethnic groups of the Empire and attempted to curb the rise of nationalism in the Ottoman Empire. This led to the Armenian National Constitution in 1863 and subsequently the Ottoman constitution of 1876 which was advocated for by the Young Ottomans. The Young Ottomans considered the modern parliamentary system to be a restatement shura, that had existed in early Islam.

The First Constitutional Era, ended two years later in 1878 when Sultan Abdül Hamid II, suspended the constitution and parliament in favor of a return to absolute monarchy.

Citing social unrest in the wake of the Ottoman's defeat in the Russo-Turkish War (1877–1878), Abdul Hamid II took the opportunity to suspend parliament. Several decades later, another group of reform-minded Ottomans, called the Young Turks, repeated the Young Ottomans' efforts, leading to the Young Turk Revolution in 1908 and the beginning of the Second Constitutional Era. Whereas the short First Constitutional Era lacked political parties, the second era initially featured unprecedented political pluralism within the empire and openly contested elections.

== History ==
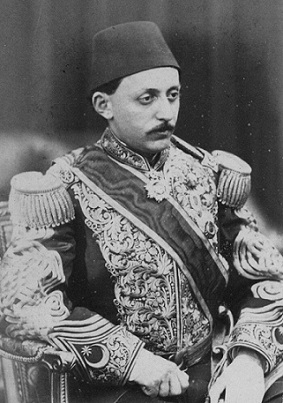
Murad V, 33rd Ottoman Sultan (Emperor)

On 30 May 1876, Murad V became the Sultan when his uncle Sultan Abdülaziz was deposed. He was highly influenced by French culture and was a liberal. He reigned for 93 days before being deposed on the grounds that he was supposedly mentally ill on 31 August 1876; however, his opponents may simply have used that as a pretext to stop his implementation of democratic reforms under a constitution.

=== Constitutional era ===
Constitutionalism was introduced in the Ottoman Empire by liberal intellectuals like Beşir Fuad, Hekim Ismail Pasha, and Ahmed Zühdü Pasha, who tried to modernize their society by promoting development, progress, and liberal values.

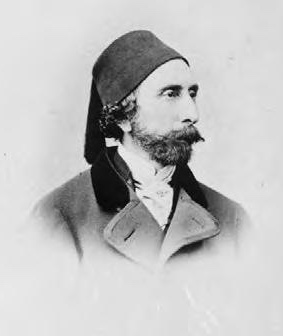
Düzoğlu Mihran Bey, liberal politician.

==== Tanzimât ====
The Tanzimât, literally meaning reorganization of the Ottoman Empire, was a period of reformation that began in 1839 and ended with the First Constitutional Era in 1876. Although the motives for the implementation of Tanzimât were bureaucratic, it was supported by Dimitrios Zambakos Pasha, Kabuli Mehmed Pasha, the Young Ottomans secret society, and Midhat Pasha, who is also often considered one of the founders of the Ottoman Parliament. Many changes were made to improve civil liberties, but many Muslims saw them as foreign influence on the world of Islam. That perception complicated reformist efforts made by the state. A policy called Ottomanism was meant to unite all the different peoples living in Ottoman territories, including Muslims and non-Muslims, Turkish, Greek, Armenian, and Jewish, Kurd, and Arab. The policy officially began with the Edict of Gülhane of 1839, declaring equality before the law for both Muslim and non-Muslim Ottomans.

The Tanzimât reforms began under Sultan Mahmud II. On November 3, 1839, Sultan Abdulmejid I issued a hatt-i sharif or imperial edict called the Edict of Gülhane or Tanzimât Fermânı. This was followed by several statutes enacting its policies. In the edict the Sultan stated that he wished "to bring the benefits of a good administration to the provinces of the Ottoman Empire through new institutions." Among the reforms, were the abolition of slavery and slave trade, the decriminalization of homosexuality, the establishment of the Civil Service School, an institution of higher learning for civilians, the Press and Journalism Regulation Code, and the Nationality Law of 1869 which created a common Ottoman citizenship irrespective of religious or ethnic affiliation. Western-educated economists like Ahmet Reşat Pasha advocated for economic liberalism.

==== Young Ottomans ====
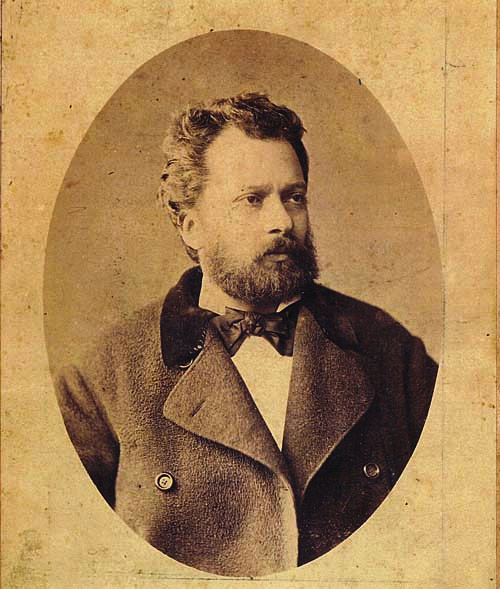
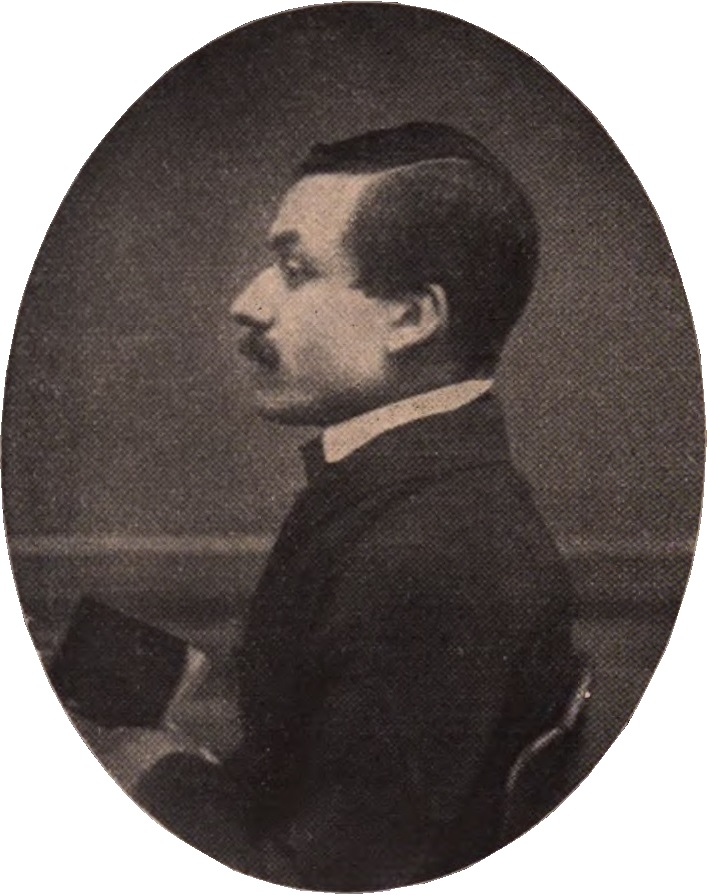
Namık Kemal (1840–1888, left) and İbrahim Şinasi (1826–1871, right), two of the most prominent members of the Young Ottomans, both of whom published and printed reformist newspapers and other works in support of constitutionality and democracy in the Ottoman Empire. Although both were repeatedly exiled by the Sultan for their efforts, their work culminated in the (albeit short-lived) adoption of the constitution of 1876 and the First Constitutional Era in the Empire.

The Young Ottomans were a secret society established in 1865 by a group of Ottoman Turkish intellectuals who were dissatisfied with the Tanzimat reforms in the Ottoman Empire, which they believed did not go far enough, and wanted to end the autocracy in the empire. Young Ottomans sought to transform Ottoman society by preserving the empire and modernizing along the European tradition of adopting a constitutional government. Though the Young Ottomans were frequently in disagreement ideologically, they all agreed that the new constitutional government should continue to be somewhat rooted in Islam to emphasize "the continuing and essential validity of Islam as the basis of Ottoman political culture." However, they combined Islamic idealism with modern liberalism and parliamentary democracy. The Young Ottomans believed European parliamentary liberalism was a model to follow, in accordance with the tenets of Islam and "attempted to reconcile Islamic concepts of government with the ideas of Montesquieu, Danton, Rousseau, and contemporary European Scholars and statesmen." Namık Kemal, who was influential in the formation of the society, admired the constitution of the French Third Republic. He summed up the Young Ottomans' political ideals as "the sovereignty of the nation, the separation of powers, the responsibility of officials, personal freedom, equality, freedom of thought, freedom of press, freedom of association, enjoyment of property, sanctity of the home". The Young Ottomans believed that one of the principal reasons for the decline of the empire was abandoning Islamic principles in favor of imitating European modernity with unadvised compromises to both and they sought to unite the two in a way that they believed would best serve the interests of the state and its people. They sought to revitalize the empire by incorporating certain Europeans models of government, while still retaining the Islamic foundations the empire was founded on. Among the prominent members of this society were writers and publicists such as İbrahim Şinasi, Namık Kemal, Ali Suavi, Ziya Pasha, and Agah Efendi.

In 1876, the Young Ottomans had their defining moment when Sultan Abdülhamid II reluctantly promulgated the Ottoman constitution of 1876 (Turkish: Kanûn-u Esâsî), the first attempt at a constitution in the Ottoman Empire, ushering in the First Constitutional Era. Although this period was short lived, with Abdülhamid ultimately suspending the constitution and parliament in 1878 in favor of a return to absolute monarchy with himself in power, the legacy and influence of the Young Ottomans continued to endure until the collapse of the empire. Several decades later, another group of reform-minded Ottomans, namely the Young Turks, repeated the Young Ottomans' efforts, leading to the Young Turk Revolution in 1908 and the beginning of the Second Constitutional Era.

=== Timeline ===
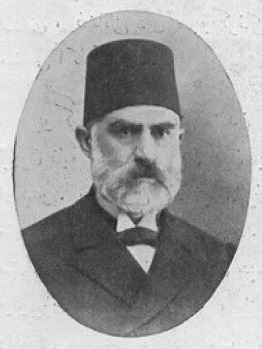
Nafi Pasha, member of the liberal Freedom and Accord Party openly discussed about voting rights for women during the Second Constitutional Era.

- 1911: As a reaction to the CUP's autocratic tendencies, the liberal Freedom and Accord Party (Hürriyet ve İtilaf Fırkası) was founded, only to be banned in 1913
- 1918: Ali Fethi Okyar founded the Ottoman Liberal People's Party (Osmanlı Hürriyetperver Avam Fırkası), which was banned by the government in 1919. The Freedom and Accord Party would be reestablished, only to collapse by 1919 in the wake of Greece's occupation of Izmir.
- 1930: In an attempt to allow a legal opposition party, Mustafa Kemal Atatürk encouraged Okyar to found the Liberal Republican Party (Serbest Cumhuriyet Fırkası). The party attracted many dissidents the Kemalist regime. Under pressure from Atatürk, Okyar dissolved his own party, fearing that it was becoming a rallying ground for counter-reformists against the secular republic.
- 1956: A liberal faction of the Democratic Party founded the Liberty Party (Hürriyet Partisi).
- 1958: The party merged into the Republican People's Party.
- 1961: A moderate faction of the former Democratic Party established after the ban the latter party founded the New Turkey Party (Yeni Türkiye Partisi).
- 1973: After initial success the party became unsuccessful and is dissolved.
- 1991: Mesut Yılmaz was elected as the leader of Motherland Party (Anavatan Partisi) and turned the party more liberal.
- 1994: The Liberal Democratic Party was founded on July 26 as the Liberal Party by former Democratic Party members and Besim Tibuk, the first president.

== See also ==
- Secularism in Turkey
- White Turks
- Politics of Turkey
- List of political parties in Turkey
