= Rum millet =

Eastern Orthodox Christian community in the Ottoman Empire

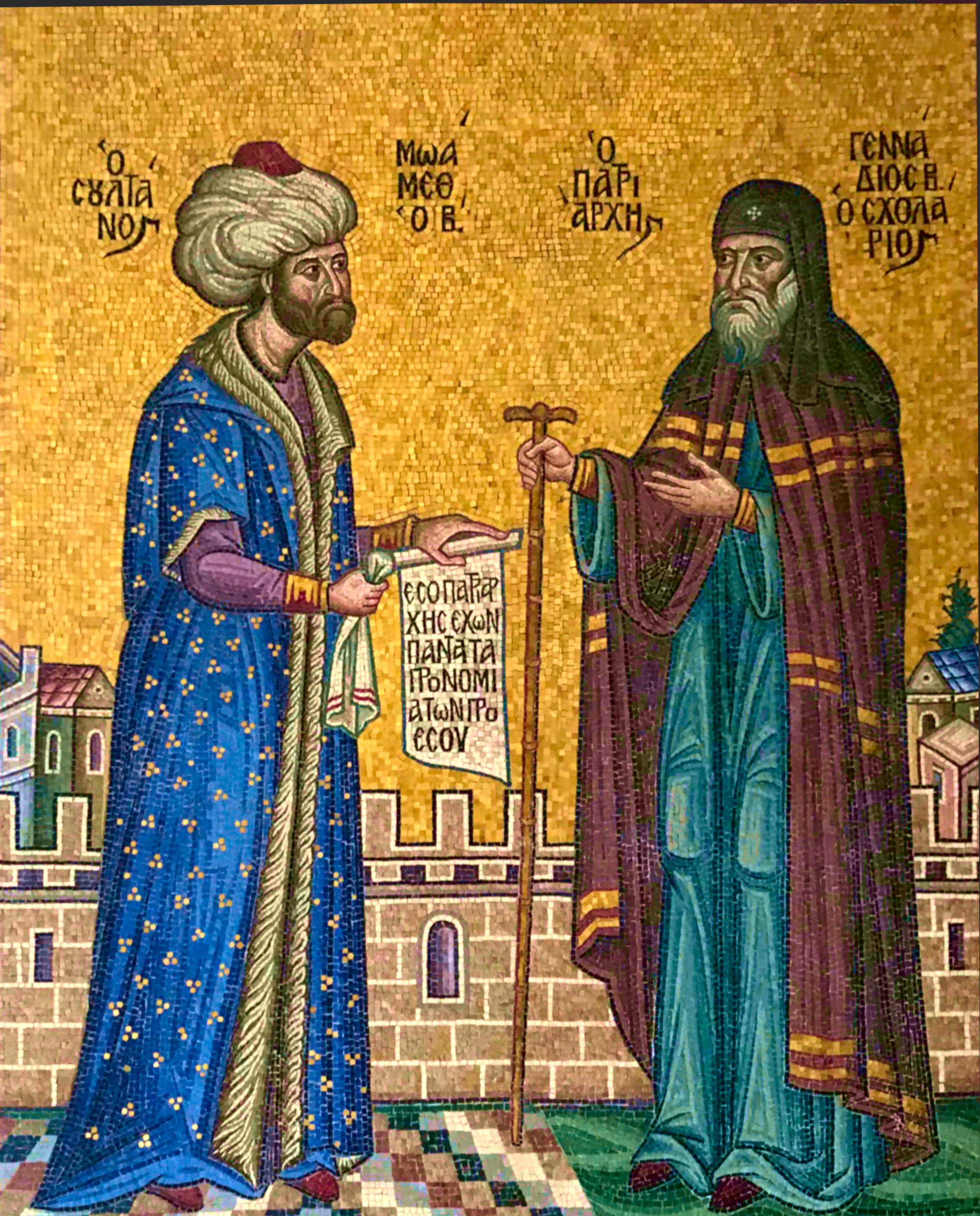
Sultan Mehmed II and the Patriarch Gennadios II. Mehmed II allowed the Ecumenical Patriarchate to remain active after the fall of Constantinople in 1453.

Rūm millet (Ottoman Turkish: millet-i Rûm, lit. 'Roman nation') was the name of the Eastern Orthodox Christian community in the Ottoman Empire, and often Anatolia in particular. Despite being subordinated within the Ottoman political system, the community maintained a certain internal autonomy.

== Establishment and development ==
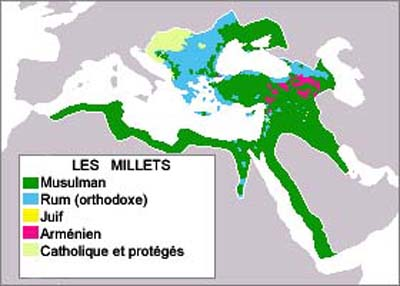
Map of prevailing religions in the territories of the Ottoman Empire in the late 16th century.

Map of the largest groups in the European territories of the Ottoman Empire around 1875.

After the fall of Constantinople to the Ottoman Empire in 1453, all Orthodox Christians were treated as a lower class of people. The Rum millet was instituted by Sultan Mehmet II who set himself to reorganise the state as the conscious heir of the Eastern Roman Empire, adding Caesar of Rome to his list of official titles. The Orthodox congregation was included in a specific ethno-religious community under Graeco-Byzantine domination. Its name was derived from the former Eastern Roman (a.k.a. Byzantine) subjects of the Ottoman Empire, but all Orthodox Greeks, Bulgarians, Albanians, Aromanians, Megleno-Romanians, Romanians and Serbs, as well as Georgians and Arab Melkites, were all considered part of the same millet in spite of their differences in ethnicity and language. Belonging to this Orthodox commonwealth became more important to the common people than their ethnic origins. This community became a basic form of social organization and source of identity for all the ethnic groups inside it and most people began to identify themselves simply as "Christians". However, under Ottoman rule ethnonyms never disappeared, which indicates that some form of ethnic identification was preserved. This is evident from a Sultan's Firman from 1680 which lists the ethnic groups in the Balkan lands of the Empire as follows: Greeks (Rum), Albanians (Arnaut), Serbs (Sirf), Vlachs (Eflak, referring to Aromanians, Megleno-Romanians, and Romanians) and the Bulgarians (Bulgar). Christian Armenians who belonged to the Armenian Apostolic Church were not included as they were given a separate millet.

Christians were guaranteed some limited freedoms, but they were not considered equal to Muslims, and their religious practices would have to defer to those of Muslims, in addition to various other legal limitations. The Ecumenical Patriarch of Constantinople was recognized as the highest religious and political leader, or ethnarch, of all Orthodox subjects. The Serbian Patriarchate of Peć and the Bulgarian Archbishopric of Ohrid, which were autonomous Eastern Orthodox Churches under the tutelage of the Ecumenical Patriarch, were taken over by the Greek Phanariotes during the 18th century. The Treaty of Küçük Kaynarca, from 1774, allowed Russia to intervene on the side of Ottoman Eastern Orthodox subjects, and most of the Porte's political tools of pressure became ineffective. At that time the Rum millet had a great deal of power—it set its own laws and collected and distributed its own taxes. The rise of nationalism in Europe under the influence of the French Revolution had extended to the Ottoman Empire and the Rum millet became increasingly independent with the establishment of its own schools, churches, hospitals and other facilities. These activities effectively moved the Christian population outside the framework of the Ottoman political system.

During Ottoman rule, those in the millet were provided with certain protections and privileges, and were treated with preference over Catholic Christians. In some areas such as Crete, both Muslims and Orthodox Christians were permitted to attempt to convert the local Catholic population. This bias towards the Orthodox worked to secure the loyalty of those within the millet. It worked to make newly conquered citizens focus less on internal divisions and more on the conflict between Orthodoxy and Catholicism. Further encouragement of Orthodox artisans who made ecclesiastical silverware, robes, and chalices made Constantinople, although under Ottoman rule, a still-vibrant hub of Orthodoxy.

== Rise of nationalism and decline ==
=== Rise of Greek nationalism ===
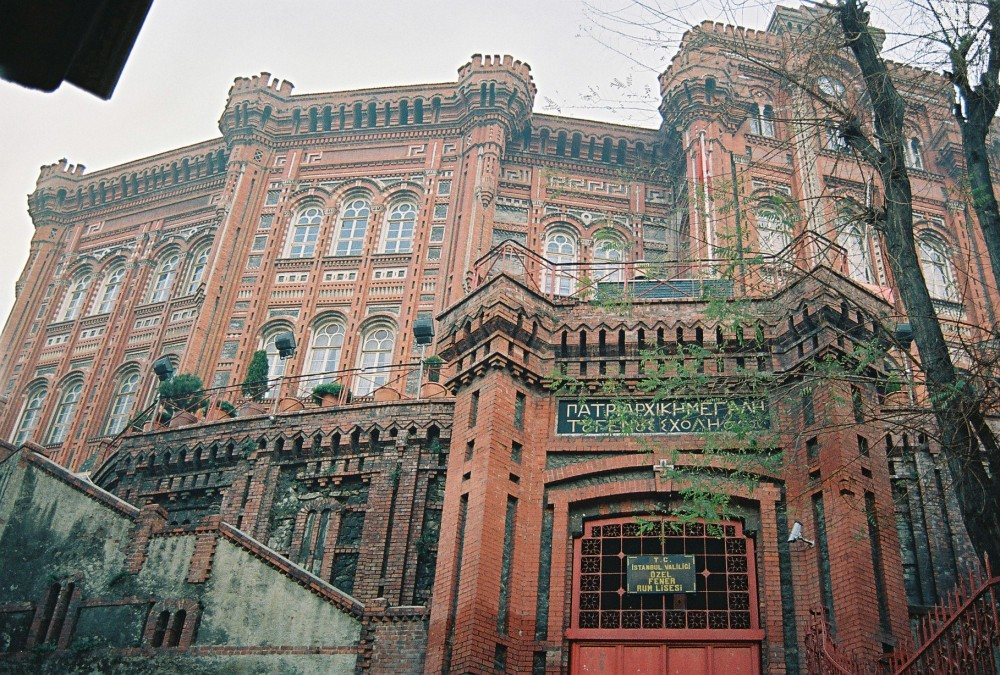
Phanar Greek Orthodox College is a Greek minority school that was founded in the Ottoman Empire in 1454.

Greek success in the Ottoman Empire can be traced to the Greek tradition of education and commerce exemplified in the Phanariotes. The wealth of the extensive merchant class provided the material basis for the intellectual revival that was the prominent feature of Greek life in the decades leading to the outbreak of the Greek War of Independence in 1821. Not coincidentally, on the eve of 1821, the three most important centres of Greek learning were situated in Chios, Smyrna and Aivali, all three major centres of Greek commerce. Greek success was also favoured by Greek domination in the leadership of the Eastern Orthodox church.

In the early 19th century, the Greek Orthodox intellectuals tried to reconceptualize the Rum millet. They argued for a new ethnic "Romaic" national identity and new Byzantine state, but their visions of a future state included all Balkan Orthodox Christians. This Megali Idea intended to revive the Eastern Roman Empire through a large Greek state. This ideology spread among the urban population of Aromanian, Slavic and Albanian origin and which started to view themselves increasingly as Greek.

On the other hand, the Ottoman Tanzimat reforms in the middle of the 19th century were aimed to encourage Ottomanism among the secessionist subject nations and stop the nationalist movements within the Empire, but failed to succeed. With the rise of nationalism under the Ottoman Empire, the Rum millet began to degrade as new millets established themselves. The Bulgarian Exarchate recognized by the Ottomans in 1870 was the answer to the unilateral declaration of an autocephalous Orthodox Church of Greece in 1833 and of Romania's in 1865. The Serbian Orthodox Church also became autocephalous in 1879.

=== During the Tanzimat era ===
During the Tanzimat era, a similar programme was carried out within the Ottoman millets. Unlike the Armenian millets, the reform in the Greek millet was slower. Most Ottoman Greek intelligentsia were more interested in the Megali Idea than millet reform. Conservatism was also a powerful movement lest reform precipitate Bulgarian demands for their own autocephalous church.

The Ecumenical Patriarch of Constantinople was traditionally the most powerful non-Muslim in the Ottoman Empire. Though there were multiple ecclesiastical hierarchies, the patriarchs of Alexandria, Antioch, and Jerusalem (and the autocephalous church of Cyprus) were much less and powerful. The Sultan conferred the Patriarch of Constantinople supreme civil authority over all Greek Orthodox people in the Empire. The Patriarch had a synod of bishops, which helped elect him, while the bishops themselves had their own council. At the bottom of the hierarchy sat the village, which every St. George's Day would elect the village elders and kocabaşıs, or local ethnarchs. Kocabaşıs would administer the finances of institutions, collect taxes, carry out minor cases of justice, and in the 19th century, collect the bedl-i askeri.

The Patriarch was traditionally elected by an assembly including members of the synod, various Greek notables, and trade guild members. After the 18th century however, this power was informally in the hands of five metropolitans known as gerontes which themselves were suspicious of any reform that could take away their power.

=== Basic law ===
While the Armenians quickly and organically moved to draw up a constitution based on the French constitution, the Porte had to pressure the Greek millet for reform after the 1856 Imperial Reform Edict, which was fiercely resisted by the gerontes. Eventually the Porte had to send the gerontes to their dioceses, and a constitutional committee produced a series of laws between 1860 and 1862 to govern the Greek millet.

Taken together, unlike the Armenian National Constitution, the basic laws for the Greeks did not produce a national assembly, and clerical control of the millet stayed strong. Only an organ designed for the patriarch's election was established which ostensibly gave the laity a large majority: 1 banker, 5 merchants, 10 artisans, 4 professional men, 8 public officials, members of a new mixed council, and 28 representatives of provincial bishoprics. But the laity were only allowed to consult and suggest other candidates from a list of three prepared by the bishops. The ultimate decision on the election was made by the clerical members, and the Porte reserved the right to strike candidates they deemed inappropriate.

The Patriarch administered his flock with a 12 bishop synod and a 4 bishop 8 layman mixed council, which could be combined so that some questions could give ecclesiastics large majorities. The mixed council supervised finances, schools, hospitals, and functioned as a court of appeal. Only Greeks of Constantinople were given suffrage to be elected and to vote for the laymen. This election was in two degrees: voters first voted for electors which formed an electoral college, when then chose the lay counselors. No provincial assemblies were established; bishops could govern without needing to consult the Greek Orthodox public.

== End ==
The 1877–1878 Russo-Turkish War dealt a decisive blow to Ottoman power in the Balkan Peninsula. The Albanians' fear that the lands they inhabited would be partitioned among neighbouring Montenegro, Serbia, Bulgaria and Greece fueled the rise of Albanian nationalism and the League of Prizren was founded. Intense ethnic and national rivalries among the Balkan peoples emerged at the eve of the 20th century in Macedonia, known as the Macedonian Struggle. The Young Turk Revolution of 1908 restored the Parliament, which had been suspended by the Sultan in 1878. However, the process of supplanting the monarchic institutions was unsuccessful and the European periphery of the Empire continued to splinter under the pressures of local revolts.

Subsequently, with the Balkan Wars (1912–1913) and the First World War (1914–1918) the Ottoman Empire lost most of its possessions, except for those in Asia Minor. During these wars and the following Greco-Turkish War (1919–1922), the Orthodox Christians there were subject to persecution and deportation, with the Assyrians and Greeks subject to a Genocide. This put an end to the community of the Rum millet. The Treaty of Lausanne from 1923, led to the recognition of the new Republic of Turkey and to the end of the Ottoman Empire.

== See also ==
- Antiochian Greek Christians
- Bulgarian Millet
- Vlach millet

== Bibliography ==
- Davison, Roderic (1963), Reform in the Ottoman Empire: 1856-1876, Princeton, New Jersey: Princeton University Press
- Detrez, Raymond (2008). "Between the Ottoman Legacy and the Temptation of the West: Bulgarians coming to terms with the Greeks". In Detrez, Raymond; Segaert, Barbara (eds.). Europe and the Historical Legacies in the Balkans. Peter Lang. ISBN 978-90-5201-374-9.
- Karpat, Kemal H (2002). Studies on Ottoman Social and Political History: Selected Articles and Essays. BRILL. ISBN 90-04-12101-3.
- Roudometof, Victor (2001). Nationalism, Globalization, and Orthodoxy: The Social Origins of Ethnic Conflict in the Balkans. Foreword by Roland Robertson. Greenwood Publishing Group. ISBN 978-0-313-31949-5.
- Mарков, Георги, ed. (2004). История на българите: Късно средновековие и Възраждане [History of the Bulgarians: Late Middle Ages and Renaissance]. TRUD Publishers. ISBN 978-954-528-467-0.

== Sources ==
- From Rum Millet to Greek Nation: Enlightenment, Secularization, and National Identity in Ottoman Balkan Society, 1453–1821, Victor Roudometof.
- Balkan cultural commonality and ethnic diversity. Raymond Detrez (Ghent University, Belgium).
