= Mikael Portukal Pasha =

Economist

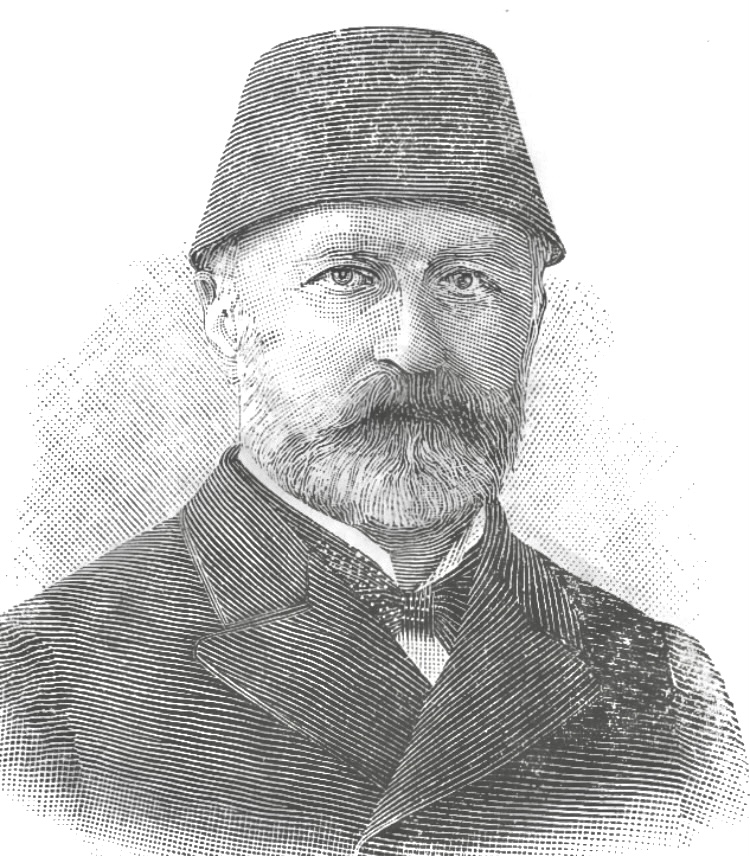
- Mikael Portukal Pasha

Personal details
- Born: 1841
- Died: 1897 (aged 55–56)

Mikael Portukal Pasha, also known as Mikael Portakalyan (1841 – 1897) was an Ottoman-Armenian economist, educator and politician during the late Tanzimat period. He succeeded Hagop Kazazian Pasha as Minister of the Privy Treasury of the Ottoman Empire, during the reign of Abdul Hamid II.

At that time, there began to be greater recognition of Armenian cultural identity in the Ottoman Empire, in an eco-demographic dynamic that fueled Armenian social and political momentum. There was indeed an urban Armenian elite in Constantinople, to the point that an Armenian could become Minister of the Privy Treasury.
