= Hagop Kazazian Pasha =

Ottoman Minister of Finance

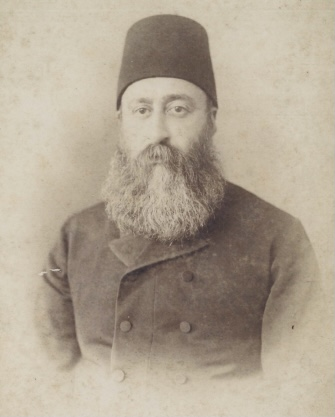

Minister of Finance
- In office 1887–1891
- Monarch: Abdul Hamid II
- Preceded by: Ahmed Zühdü Pasha
- Succeeded by: Hüseyin Tevfik Pasha

Minister of the Privy Treasury
- In office 1880–1891
- Monarch: Abdul Hamid II
- Preceded by: Office established
- Succeeded by: Mikael Portukal Pasha

Personal details
- Born: 1836 Istanbul, Ottoman Empire
- Died: 1891 (aged 54–55) Istanbul, Ottoman Empire
- Awards: Order of St. Gregory the Great

Hagop Kazazian Pasha (alternative spelling: Agop Kazazyan) (1836–1891) was a high-ranking Ottoman Armenian official, who served as the Minister of Finance and the Minister of the Privy Treasury during the reign of Sultan Abdul Hamid II. Famed for his loyalty, he received a state funeral when he died in 1891 in a horse-riding accident on the grounds of Kalender Kasrı while riding a horse that had been a gift from the sultan.

== Biography ==
=== Life and early career ===
Despite Hagop Kazazian's lack of higher education, he was able to rise in the bureaucracy of the Ottoman State through the diligence he showed in financial matters. During the early years of his career, he served as the head of the translation department for the Ottoman Bank, a post that allowed him to forge ties to the Palace. After uncovering a case of malpractice at the bank, he was recommended by the General Director of the Ottoman Bank to Sultan Abdul Hamid II, who was looking to put the affairs of the Privy Treasury in order.

A bachelor all his life, Hagop Kazazian lived in the Yeniköy district of Istanbul with his mother. Since Kazazian was awarded the Order of St. Gregory the Great by the Pope (an award rarely given to non-Catholics), it is possible that he had connections with the Armenian Catholic Church, a small minority within the Armenian community that was considered a separate religious millet by the Ottoman Porte.

=== Posts and awards ===
Abdul Hamid II appointed Kazazian as the Director of the Privy Treasury in 1879, and as Minister the following year, when the Privy Treasury was re-organized as a ministry. Under Kazazian, the Privy Treasury was greatly reformed, expenditures were cut, and the income of the treasury improved significantly with building of numerous railways and the anticipation of oil revenues from Mesopotamia. In 1887, he was appointed as the Minister of Finance, holding both posts simultaneously. Carrying out reforms and expenditure cuts in the Finance Ministry, Kazazian was opposed in his measures, which prompted him to offer his resignation. The sultan refused the resignation and supported Kazazian in his reform attempts. As Minister of Finance, Kazazian showed great ability at raising Ottoman loans and easing payment of its debts.

An influential man in his time, Kazazian interceded successfully on behalf of Sarkis Balyan, a famed architect who had been exiled to France because of political accusations. Kazazian also served as a member of the Armenian National Assembly, which was established in 1863 and regulated the temporal matters of the Armenian population of the Ottoman Empire under the Millet system.

Kazazian was given the title of Pasha, an honorific reserved for the highest elite of the Empire, as well as a number of decorations by the sultan with whom he was a favorite. He was also awarded the Order of St. Gregory the Great by Pope Pius IX.

=== Death and afterward ===
Famed at the time for his loyalty to Sultan Abdul Hamid II, he received a state funeral after he died in 1891 on the grounds of Kalender Kasrı in an accident while riding a horse that had been a gift from the sultan. Kazazian Pasha was succeeded as the Minister of the Privy Treasury by two other Armenians, Mikael Portukal Pasha, who served until 1897 and was, in turn, succeeded by Ohannes Pasha.

== See also ==
- List of Ottoman ministers of finance
- Armenians in the Ottoman Empire

Preceded by Office established	Minister of the Privy Treasury of the Ottoman Empire; 1880–1891	Succeeded by Mikael Portukal Pasha
Preceded by Ahmet Zühtü Pasha	Minister of Finance of the Ottoman Empire; 1887–1891	Succeeded by Hüseyin Tevfik Pasha
