= Ministry of Navy (Ottoman Empire) =

Ministry of the Navy
- (Ottoman Turkish: بحریه نظارتی); Bahriye Nezâreti
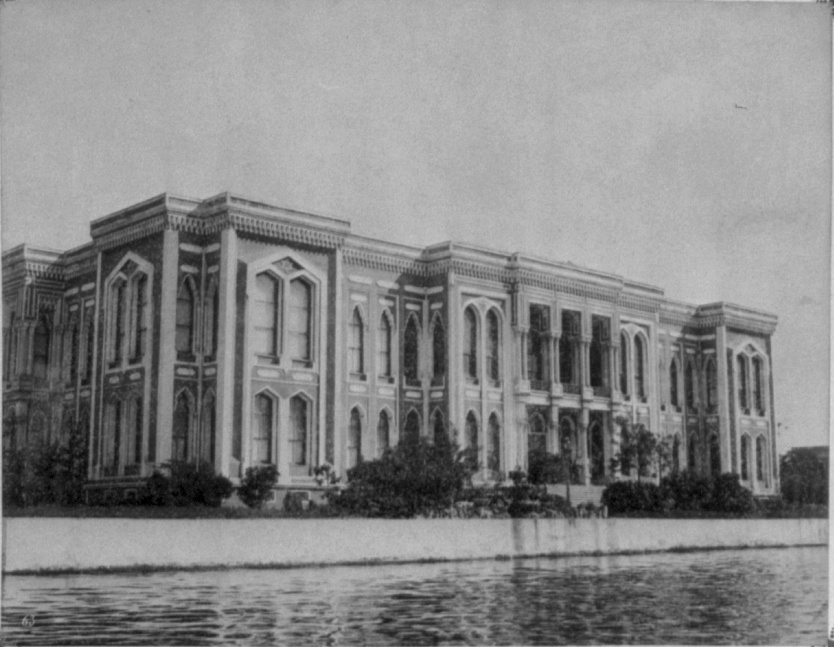
- Ministry of the Navy Building, Kasımpaşa, Beyoğlu, Istanbul

Agency overview
- Formed: 1867
- Preceding agency: Kapudan Pasha
- Dissolved: 4 November 1922
- Superseding agency: Naval Forces Command of the Republic of Turkey
- Jurisdiction: Ottoman Empire
- Headquarters: Kasımpaşa, Constantinople
- Parent agency: Grand vizier

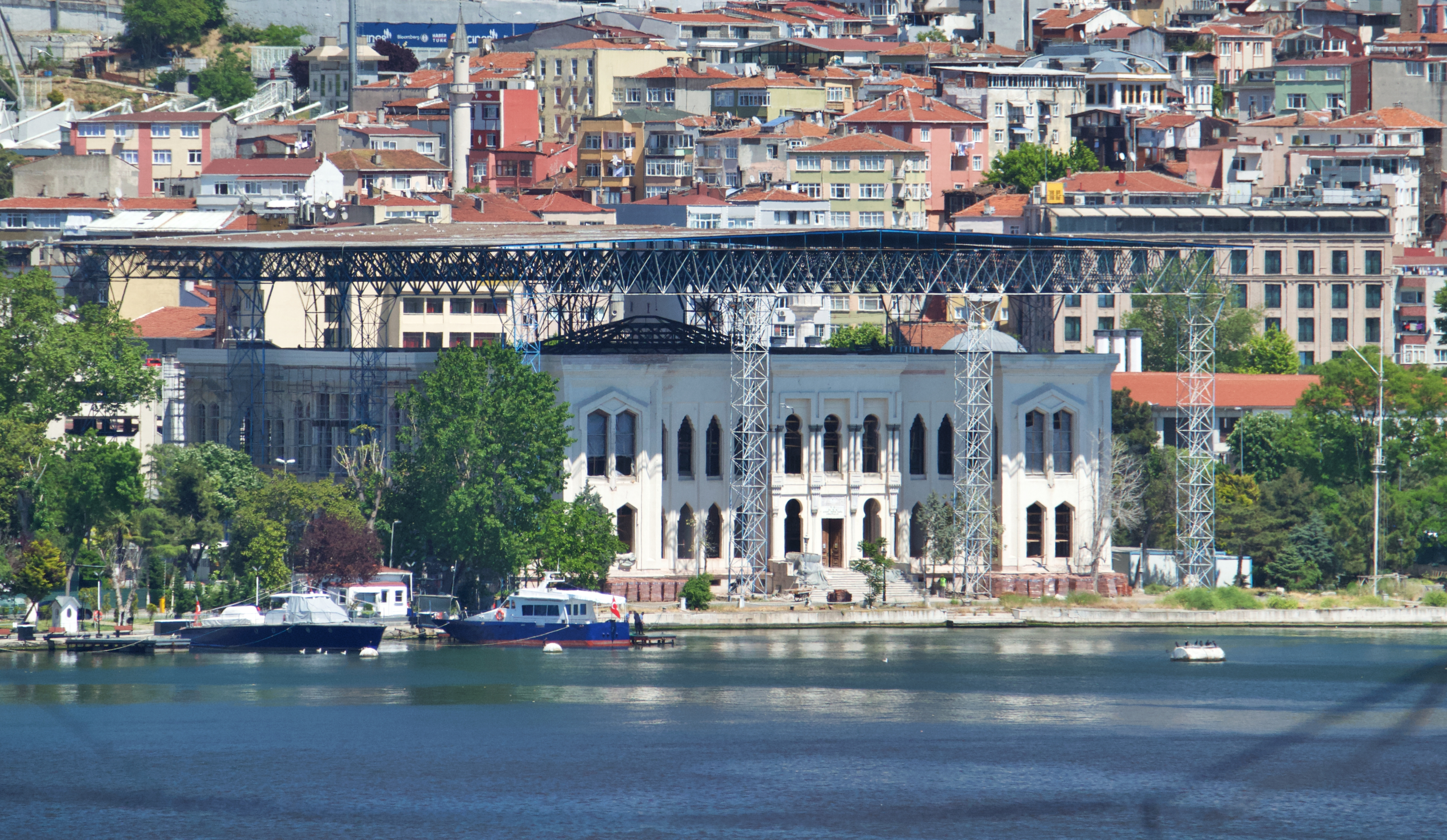
The Ministry of the Navy Building located in Kasımpaşa (May 2022)

The Ministry of the Navy (Ottoman Turkish: باهريه نظارتى; Turkish: Bahriye Nezâreti, often shortened to Bahriye) was the department responsible for the Ottoman Navy within the Ottoman Empire.

From the formative years of the Ottoman State until 1867, the highest authority responsible for the Ottoman Navy was the Kapudan-ı Derya (Grand Admiral). However, during the reforms of 1867, it was decided to establish the Meclis-i Vükelâ (Council of Ministers). To represent the navy within this council, the Ministry of the Navy was inaugurated. Initially, the duties of the Kapudan-ı Derya were executed by the Minister of the Navy. Subsequently, the office of the Kapudan-ı Derya was reinstated as a subordinate position to the Minister of the Navy. The Minister of the Navy was entrusted with the financial administration of the fleet, including the procurement and construction of vessels, whereas the Kapudan-ı Derya served exclusively as the military commander of the fleet.

The headquarters of the Ottoman Ministry of the Navy was located in the Kasımpaşa district of Istanbul, in the building currently serving as the Northern Sea Area Command. The functions of the Ministry of the Navy were terminated in 1922. Following the proclamation of the Republic, these duties have been administered by the Naval Forces Command.

== List of Ministers of the Navy ==
This list encompasses the names of the Ottoman Ministers of the Navy, along with their respective dates of appointment and termination of office:

No.	Portrait	Ministers of the Navy	Took office	Left office	Time in office
1	İsmail Hakkı Pasha	İsmail Hakkı Pasha	March 1867	March 1868	1 year
2	Mahmud Nedim Pasha	Mahmud Nedim Pasha	March 1868	September 1871	3 years, 6 months
3	Abdülhamid Ferid Pasha	Abdülhamid Ferid Pasha	September 1871	November 1871	2 months
4	Fosfor Mustafa Pasha	Fosfor Mustafa Pasha	December 1871	January 1872	1 month
5	Hasan Samih Pasha	Hasan Samih Pasha	February 1872	March 1872	1 month
6	İbrahim Halil Pasha	İbrahim Halil Pasha	March 1872	August 1872	5 months
7	Sakızlı Ahmed Esad Pasha	Sakızlı Ahmed Esad Pasha	August 1872	October 1872	2 months
(4)	Fosfor Mustafa Pasha	Fosfor Mustafa Pasha	October 1872	November 1872	1 month
8	Mehmed Namık Pasha	Mehmed Namık Pasha	November 1872	January 1873	2 months
9	Hüseyin Avni Pasha	Hüseyin Avni Pasha	January 1873	February 1873	1 month
10	Hasan Rıza Pasha	Hasan Rıza Pasha	February 1873	June 1873	4 months
11	Kayserili Ahmed Pasha	Kayserili Ahmed Pasha	June 1873	January 1875	1 year, 7 months
(7)	Sakızlı Ahmed Esad Pasha	Sakızlı Ahmed Esad Pasha	March 1875	April 1875	1 month
12	Mehmed Rauf Pasha bin Abdi Pasha	Mehmed Rauf Pasha bin Abdi Pasha	May 1875	August 1875	3 months
(10)	Hasan Rıza Pasha	Hasan Rıza Pasha	September 1875	September 1875	Less than 1 month
(8)	Mehmed Namık Pasha	Mehmed Namık Pasha	October 1875	November 1875	1 month
13	Ibrahim Dervish Pasha	Ibrahim Dervish Pasha	January 1876	April 1876	3 months
14	Abdülkerim Nadir Pasha	Abdülkerim Nadir Pasha	April 1876	May 1876	1 month
(11)	Kayserili Ahmed Pasha	Kayserili Ahmed Pasha	May 1876	January 1877	8 months
(12)	Mehmed Rauf Pasha bin Abdi Pasha	Mehmed Rauf Pasha bin Abdi Pasha	January 1877	December 1877	11 months
15	İngiliz Said Pasha	İngiliz Said Pasha	December 1877	April 1878	4 months
(6)	İbrahim Halil Pasha	İbrahim Halil Pasha	April 1878	May 1878	1 month
16	Ahmed Vesim Pasha	Ahmed Vesim Pasha	May 1878	January 1879	8 months
17	Rasim Pasha	Rasim Pasha	January 1879	January 1881	2 years
18	Hasan Hüsnü Pasha	Hasan Hüsnü Pasha	January 1881	November 1882	1 year, 10 months
19	Ahmed Ratip Pasha	Ahmed Ratip Pasha	30 November 1882	2 December 1882	2 days
(18)	Hasan Hüsnü Pasha	Hasan Hüsnü Pasha	December 1882	July 1903	20 years, 7 months
20	Mehmed Celaleddin Pasha	Mehmed Celaleddin Pasha	August 1903	December 1907	4 years, 4 months
21	Hasan Rami Pasha	Hasan Rami Pasha	December 1907	July 1908	7 months
22	İbrahim Halil Pasha	İbrahim Halil Pasha	28 July 1908	5 August 1908	8 days
23	Arif Hikmet Pasha	Arif Hikmet Pasha	August 1908	February 1909	6 months
24	Hüseyin Hüsnü Pasha	Hüseyin Hüsnü Pasha	11 February 1909	17 February 1909	6 days
25	Ali Rıza Pasha	Ali Rıza Pasha	February 1909	April 1909	2 months
26	Emin Pasha	Emin Pasha	14 April 1909	5 May 1909	21 days
(23)	Arif Hikmet Pasha	Arif Hikmet Pasha	May 1909	January 1910	8 months
(22)	İbrahim Halil Pasha	İbrahim Halil Pasha	January 1910	13 June 1910	5 months
27	Hulusi Salih Pasha	Hulusi Salih Pasha	13 June 1910	24 October 1910	4 months, 11 days
28	Mahmud Muhtar Pasha	Mahmud Muhtar Pasha	14 November 1910	30 September 1911	10 months, 16 days
29	Hurşid Pasha	Hurşid Pasha	October 1911	July 1912	9 months
(28)	Mahmud Muhtar Pasha	Mahmud Muhtar Pasha	22 July 1912	30 October 1912	3 months, 8 days
30	Mahmud Pasha	Mahmud Pasha	24 January 1913	9 March 1914	1 year, 1 month, 13 days
31	Ahmed Djemal Pasha	Ahmed Djemal Pasha	10 March 1914	14 October 1918	4 years, 7 months, 4 days
32	Rauf Bey	Rauf Bey	October 1918	November 1918	1 month
33	Ali Rıza Pasha	Ali Rıza Pasha	11 November 1918	4 March 1919	3 months, 21 days
34	Mehmed Şakir Pasha	Mehmed Şakir Pasha	4 March 1919	2 April 1919	29 days
35	Ahmed Avni Pasha	Ahmed Avni Pasha	April 1919	July 1919	3 months
(27)	Hulusi Salih Pasha	Hulusi Salih Pasha	21 July 1919	8 March 1920	7 months, 16 days
36	Mehmed Esat Pasha	Mehmed Esat Pasha	14 March 1920	5 April 1920	22 days
37	Kara Mehmed Said Pasha	Kara Mehmed Said Pasha	April 1920	July 1920	3 months
38	Ahmed Hamdi Pasha	Ahmed Hamdi Pasha	July 1920	October 1920	3 months
(27)	Hulusi Salih Pasha	Hulusi Salih Pasha	21 October 1920	23 April 1921	6 months, 2 days
39	Çürüksulu Ziya Pasha	Çürüksulu Ziya Pasha	April 1921	June 1921	2 months
(27)	Hulusi Salih Pasha	Hulusi Salih Pasha	12 June 1921	4 November 1922	1 year, 4 months, 23 days

== Gallery ==
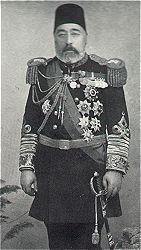
Hasan Hüsnü (Bozcaadalı).

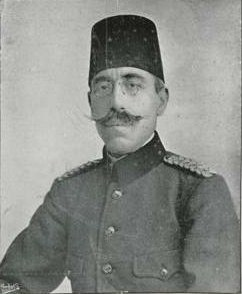
Mushir Salih Hulusi (Kezrak) (Inf. 1301–1).

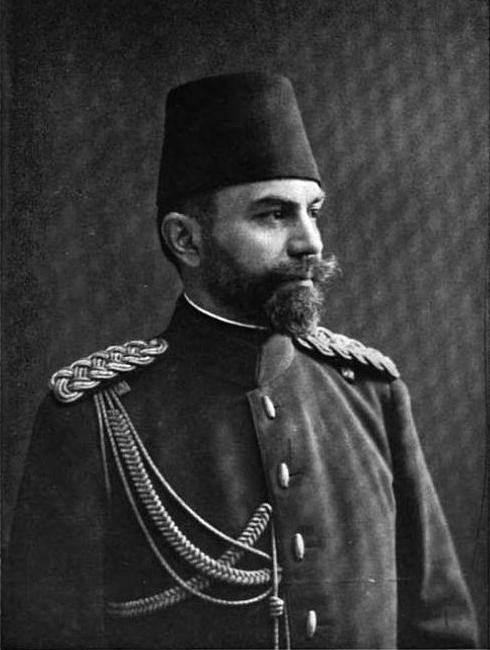
Ferik Mahmud Muhtar Pasha (Cav. 1304).

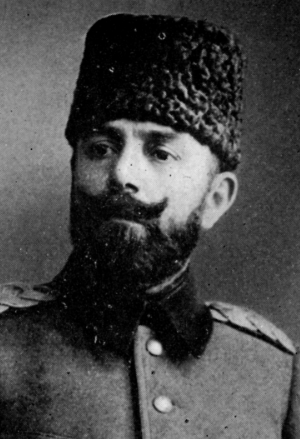
Ferik Djemal (the Elder) (Inf. 1309).

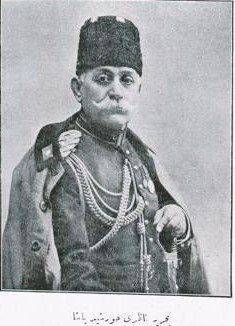
Hurshid Pasha

== See also ==
- List of Kapudan Pashas
- List of Fleet commanders of the Ottoman Navy
- Dilaver Pasha Regulations
