= Conscription in the Ottoman Empire =

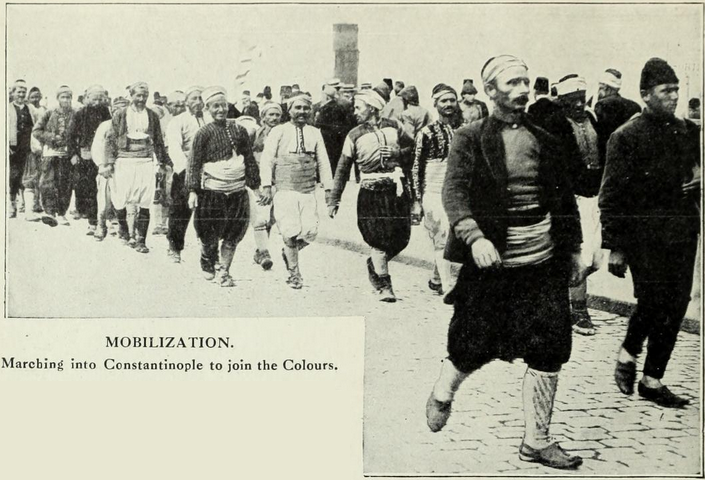
Ottoman men conscription WWI in Istanbul.

Military conscription in the Ottoman Empire varied in the periods of:

- the Classical Army (1451–1606)
- the Reform Period (1826–1858)
- the Modern Army (1861–1922)

A complex set of rules applied, which involved:

- A poll-tax (in the very early times) named cizye, originally imposed on non-Muslims as a substitute for military service.
- An exemption tax, from 1855 the Bedl-i askeri, which applied to everyone and was theoretically a substitute for military service.
- Western-style conscription, closely linked to the introduction of a European-style army, the Modern Army (1861–1922), but not exactly coinciding with it.

== Classic period ==
No universal military conscription existed during this period. Recruitment in the Ottoman imperial army was achieved by the forced enlistment of Christian children every five years. The devşirme came up out of the kul system of slavery that developed in the early centuries of the Ottoman Empire, and which reached this final development during the reign of Bayezid I. The kul were mostly prisoners from war, hostages, or slaves that were purchased by the state. The Ottoman Empire, beginning with Murad I, felt a need to "counteract the power of Turkic nobles by developing Christian vassal soldiers and converted kapıkulu as his personal troops, independent of the regular army."

== Reform period ==
In 1839, a system of conscription was introduced through the Gulhane proclamation. In times of need, every town, quarter, and village would be required to present a fully equipped conscript at the recruiting office. In 1848, detailed regulations on the draft were published. It stated that in the Muslim millet, citizens were required to serve.

A draft for non-Muslims was introduced in 1856, but the exemption tax in place was not forbidden, unlike a similar payment available for Muslims. As the poll tax for non-Muslims had been abolished, the authorities were not encouraging military service for them, preferring the revenue. Nevertheless, some non-Muslims did enter the military in support functions. The head of the guard of Abdülhamid II was Greek, with the rank of brigadier.

=== Bedel-i nakdī ===
The system of exemptions through the bedel-i nakdī and the bedel-i askerī meant that the burden never fell equally on all Ottoman subjects. The rich evaded the burdens of military service. The socio-economic distribution of the Ottoman Empire was not even, and the non-Muslim members of Ottoman society had the highest income levels. Even in the end, the Ottoman army remained an army of Anatolian Muslim peasants.

== Modern Army ==
Service in the regular army gradually shortened with the modern army. In 1908, it was three years.

=== 1909 reforms ===
In July 1909, a military service law was passed that made conscription compulsory for all Ottoman citizens. The law was opposed by Muslim students in religious colleges who had failed their exams and Muslims of the capital city who had lost their exempt status. The opposition also came from non-Muslim Ottoman citizens. The spokesmen of the Greek, Syrian, Armenian, and Bulgarian communities agreed to the new military service law in theory. However, in practice, each member wanted to serve in their own segregated brigades and companies. They wanted to keep their own military structure rather than uniting under a single flag. They demanded to have ethnically designed uniforms so that they would be separated from each other.

These units, if established, would be commanded by Christian officers. The Bulgarian non-Muslims did not want to serve non-European provinces. Armenians were separated by their partisan attachments. These practices were the opposite of Ottomanism. The government thought that keeping the Ottoman Empire as a single entity could not include an army that could decline to go to war because of their ethnic assignments. They claimed an army on a national or religious base only served the rise of nationalism under the Ottoman Empire.

In October 1909, the recruitment of conscripts irrespective of religion was ordered for the first time. Beginning with the 1910 Balkan Wars, and extending to World War I, at the grassroots level, many young Ottoman Christian men, especially Greeks, who could afford it and who had the overseas connections, opted to leave the country or hide as a draft dodger.

=== World War I ===
On 12 May 1914, the Ottoman Empire established a new recruitment law. This new law lowered the conscription age from 20 to 18 and abolished the redif (reserve system). Deployments were set at two years for the infantry, three years for other branches of the army, and five years for the navy. These measures remained largely theoretical during World War I. The Ottoman Empire in 1914 could only draft 70,000 or about 35 percent of the relevant population. In Bulgaria, the ratio at the same time was 75 percent. Fully mobilized, as, in early 1915, only 4 percent of the population was under arms and on active duty compared with 10 percent of personnel in France.

On 2 August 1914, the Ottoman Empire issued a mobilization order that went into effect the following day asking for all eligible men between 20 and 45 years old to go to the nearest local recruiting office within 3 days to join the military. Obeying this order was required and those not complying would be punished. Those who lived in Istanbul, Mecca and Medina were exempted from military service; while "entire professional classes", religious students, women and mullahs were exempted. Those who were irreplaceable breadwinners or nomads were eligible to serve in theory but often were exempted.

== See also ==
- Seferberlik
