= Bozcaadalı Hasan Hüsnü Pasha =

Ottoman admiral (1832–1903)

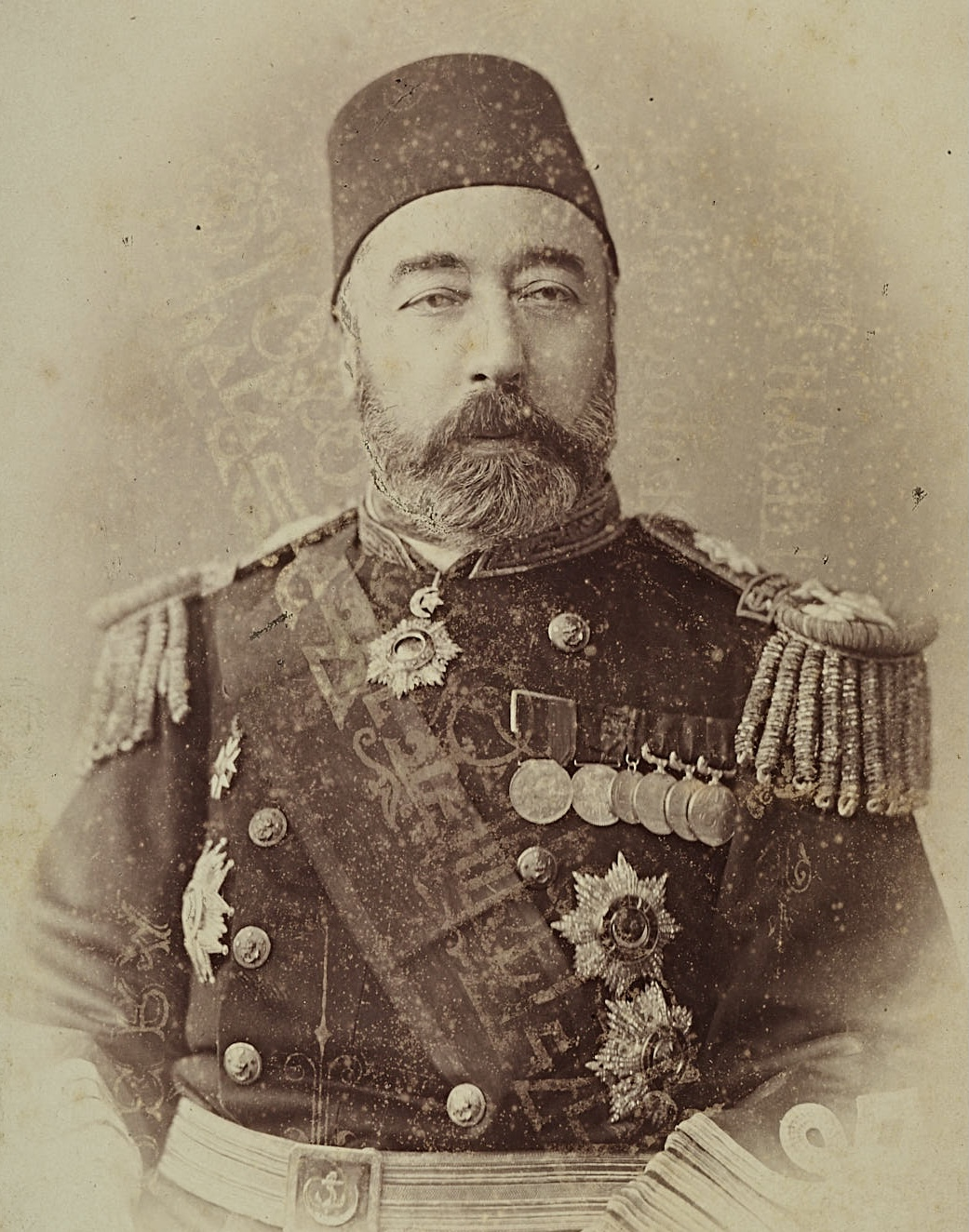
- Born: 1832; Constantinople
- Died: 1903 (aged 70–71)
- Military career
- Allegiance: Ottoman Empire
- Branch: Ottoman Navy
- Rank: Admiral
- Conflicts: Russo-Turkish War (1877–78)

Bozcaadalı Hasan Hüsnü Pasha (1832–1903) was an Ottoman admiral, who participated in the Russo-Turkish War (1877–78). In 1880 he became the Minister of the Ottoman Navy (Bahriye Nazırı).
