= Kasımpaşa =

Kasımpaşa may refer to:

- Kasımpaşa, Beyoğlu, a quarter in Istanbul, Turkey
- Kasımpaşa S.K., a Turkish football club
