= Dilaver Pasha Regulations =

Mining code

The Dilaver Pasha Regulation (Turkish: Ereğli Kömür Maden-i Hümâyûnu İdaresinin Nizamnamesi), is a mining code prepared by Dilaver Pasha and promulgated on 8 May 1867. This regulatory instrument introduced formal arrangements for mining labourers in the Ottoman Empire. The regulation maintained its validity from 1867 until 1922. It is regarded in Turkish history as the first legal text aimed at protecting the health of mine workers and regulating their working conditions. Notwithstanding its progressive character relative to its era, it also instituted a compulsory labour obligation. Two original manuscript copies of the Regulation are currently held in the Library of the Istanbul Naval Museum.

== Overview ==
In the Ottoman Empire, regulations concerning mineworkers were generally based on the principles of sharia law. This system persisted until the mid-19th century. During this period, mine workers typically consisted of townspeople residing in mining regions, designated as the "Madenciyan taifesi" (Mining Class), and the profession was inherited primarily from father to son. Labour wages were determined by imperial decrees (fermans) issued in different periods. Following the discovery of coal deposits in Karadeniz Ereğli during the reign of Abdulmecid I, certain areas in this region were incorporated into the "Hazine-i Hassa" lands by an imperial decree. Subsequently, a consortium formed by Galata bankers took over the operation of the mines established in these areas. Per the agreement, the coal extracted was to be allocated to the Ministry of Navy to meet the requirements of the Ottoman Navy. The British took over the coal extraction operations when the Crimean War broke out, and they continued to manage them throughout the hostilities. Following the conclusion of the war, the management of the mines reverted to the Hazine-i Hassa. This period saw a decline in coal production, which poor management practices caused. Concurrently, grievances about the health and working conditions of the labourers increased. In 1858, the Land Code was promulgated, introducing new obligations regarding the ownership of mines. With the Mining Law (Maadin Kanunu) of 1869, forced labour in mines was prohibited.

=== Administrative Reforms of Dilaver Pasha ===
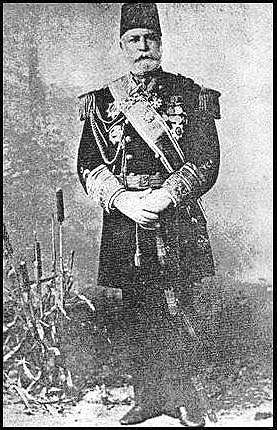
Dilaver Pasha, Superintendent of the Ereğli Mines

Prior to the formal codification of the 1865 regulation, Dilaver Pasha was appointed as the Governor (Kaymakam) of the Ereğli Sanjak and the Ministry of the Imperial Mines (Maadin-i Hümayun Nazırı) by imperial decree. Establishing Ereğli as the administrative headquarters, he inaugurated the Mining Directorate (Maadin Nezareti) and implemented a structured military governance model within the Zonguldak coal basin. To ensure operational security and oversight, he formed specialised commissions for the Kozlu mines and deployed naval officers supported by military detachments across the mining districts.

Under his tenure, the administrative framework of the basin was standardised through a rigorous system of licensing and boundary demarcation. Dilaver Pasha introduced formal hierarchies for officials, defined the legal rights and duties of miners, and prohibited unauthorised excavation to prevent irregular production. His technical reforms included the systematic numbering of mine shafts and the naming of coal seams. To modernise the logistics of the basin, he facilitated the construction of new railways, narrow-gauge Decauville lines, and loading chutes (varagele) at mine entrances. Furthermore, he secured the timber supply for mining operations by designating the forests of the Ereğli Sanjak specifically for the production of mine props, thereby integrating environmental resources into the industrial infrastructure.

=== Innovations of the Regulation ===
The administration of the Ereğli coal basin was transferred to the Ministry of Navy in 1865. Dilaver Pasha was appointed to the mining region on behalf of the Ministry of the Navy. Following two years of investigation, he published the Dilaver Pasha Regulation, which bore his name. The Regulation comprised a total of seven sections and one hundred articles. Through this Regulation, the administrative structure of the mines was defined, operating rights were re-evaluated, and the purchase and sale of the extracted coal were established on specific principles. Under Article 21 of the Regulation, healthy males aged between 13 and 50 from 14 village communities in the region were subjected to a labour obligation in the mines for six months each year. By Article 29, the daily working duration was reduced to 10 hours; Article 30 addressed the health issues of workers and their remedies; Article 56 granted leave to Muslim miners on religious holidays and to Christians on Easter; Article 68 stipulated that the costs of food, drink, and other necessities for the workers would be borne by the mine management; and Article 82 prohibited workers from engaging in any other private employment outside the mine.

The Dilaver Pasha Regulation remained in force until 10 September 1921. It was superseded on the same date by the "Law Concerning the Rights of Mine Workers in the Coal Basin" (Ottoman Turkish Havza-i Fahmiye Maden Amelesinin Hukukuna Müteallik Kanun), which re-regulated working conditions in the mines and prohibited the employment of persons under the age of 18.
