= Ahmed Zühdü Pasha =

Turkish politician

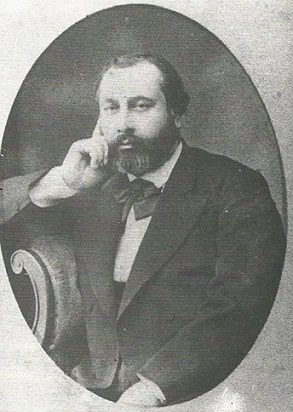
- Ahmed Zühdü Pasha in 1876

Personal details
- Born: 1834 Constantinople, Ottoman Empire
- Died: 1902 (aged 67–68)

Ahmed Zühdü Pasha (1834 – 1902) was an Ottoman liberal statesman during the First Constitutional Era, who later held the post of minister of education.
