= Bedl-i askeri =

The bedl-i askeri (or bedel-i askeri) was a tax in the later Ottoman Empire, a result of the tanzimat reforms.

Historically, cizye originated as a poll-tax on non-Muslims which, in the Ottoman Empire, was theoretically a substitute for military service, as Christians and people of other religions were not permitted to bear arms. Over time, the Ottoman military transition from feudal conscripts to professional armies led to many members of the Muslim public paying a charge in lieu of military service too.

However, the Khatt-i Humayun firman in 1856 – a cornerstone of the tanzimat reform process – explicitly granted more equal tax-treatment to people of all religions. This would have abolished the use of the cizye system to maintain an all-Muslim army; but there was little interest in creating a multi-faith army, so the Porte replaced the cizye with bedl-i askeri, a tax payable only by non-Muslims who would have been liable for conscription. The bedl-i askeri was set at 50 lira per person. Not all men within a certain age-range would have been liable for conscription (in order to maintain a certain size of army), so only certain individuals were liable – and the proportion shrank as the empire's population grew. Over time, this bedl-i askeri began to be shared out amongst most non-Christian men, not just those who would have been conscripted, so the new tax came to resemble the old cizye again, and each person's share might only be 5 to 7 piasters.

The 1909 constitution introduced compulsory conscription, and abolished any payment in lieu of conscription; so the bedl-i askeri ceased.

The term "askeri" literally meant "military", but over the course of Ottoman history it came to refer to a ruling class; civil servants, ulema, and officers – in contrast to the raya, who were taxpayers rather than decision-makers.
