= Dimitrios Zambakos Pasha =

Ottoman Greek liberal politician and physician

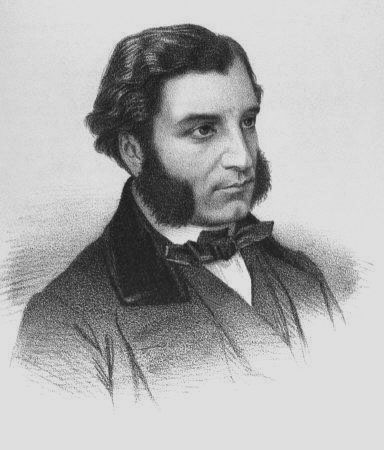
- c. 1863
- Born: 1831; Constantinople, Ottoman Empire (now Istanbul, Turkey)
- Died: 1913 (aged 81–82); Cairo, British Empire (now Cairo, Egypt)
- Occupations: Physician, politician

Dimitrios Zambakos Pasha (Greek: Δημήτριος Ζαμπάκος, Turkish: Dimitri Zambako Paşa; 1831 – 1913) was an Ottoman Greek liberal politician and physician, who was one of the leading surgeons in the Ottoman Empire. He was considered to be among the founders of the Ottoman Parliament.
