= Kabuli Mehmed Pasha =

Ottoman pasha

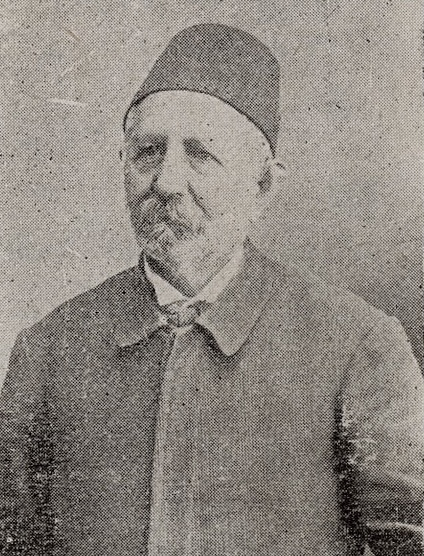
- Born: 1812; Constantinople, Ottoman Empire
- Died: 1877 (aged 64–65); Constantinople
- Occupations: Politician, government minister.

Kabuli Mehmed Pasha (1812 – 1877) was an Ottoman liberal politician and government minister.
