= Krumovgrad =

Krumovgrad Крумовград
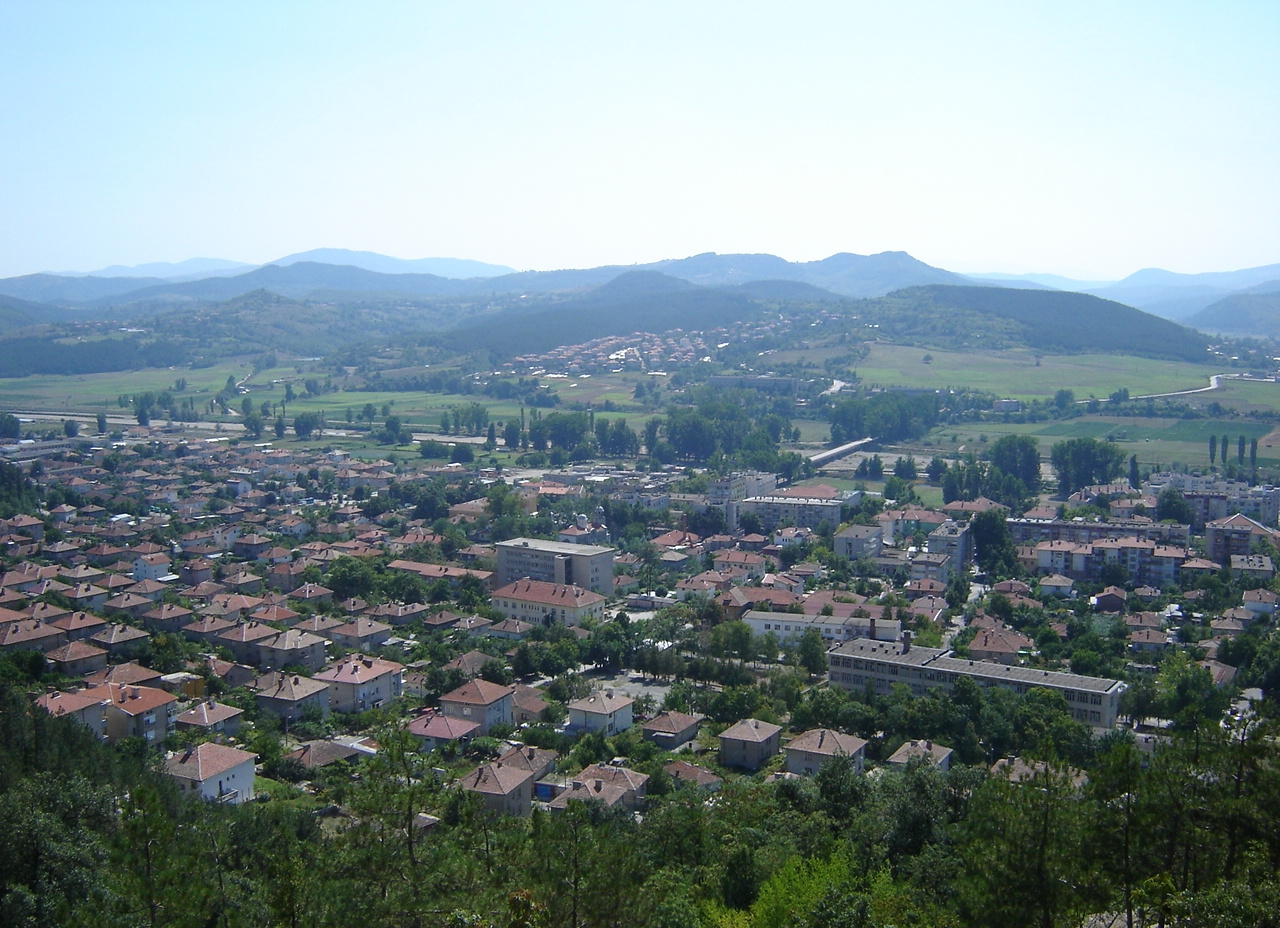
- View of Krumovgrad

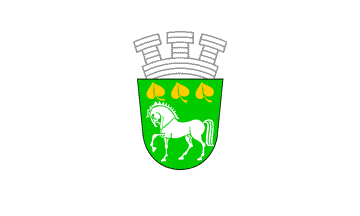
- Flag Coat of arms

- Location of Krumovgrad
- Coordinates: 41°28′N 25°39′E
- Country: Bulgaria
- Province (Oblast): Kardzhali

Government
  - Mayor: Sebihan Mehmed
- Elevation: 209 m (686 ft)

Population (13.09.2005)
  - Total: 8,690
- Time zone: UTC+2 (EET)
  - Summer (DST): UTC+3 (EEST)
- Postal Code: 6900
- Area code: 03641
- Website: krumovgrad.bg

Krumovgrad (Bulgarian: Крумовград [ˈkrumovˌɡrat], Turkish: Koşukavak [koˈʃukavak]) is a town in Kardzhali Province in the south of Bulgaria, located in the Eastern Rhodopes on the banks of the river Krumovitsa. According to 2011 census, the population is ethnic Bulgarians (48.97%), ethnic Turks (18.95%), and others including the Romani people. The town is named after the successful medieval Bulgarian ruler Krum, the name meaning 'city of Krum' in Bulgarian.

== Municipality ==
Krumovgrad is also the seat of Krumovgrad municipality (part of Kardzhali Province), which includes the following 78 villages:

Climate data for Krumovgrad 1991-2023, records(1926-2024)
Month	Jan	Feb	Mar	Apr	May	Jun	Jul	Aug	Sep	Oct	Nov	Dec	Year
Record high °F (°C)	72.9 (22.7)	74.1 (23.4)	83.8 (28.8)	91.4 (33.0)	98.2 (36.8)	103.5 (39.7)	109.9 (43.3)	109.9 (43.3)	104.0 (40.0)	98.4 (36.9)	86.0 (30.0)	74.1 (23.4)	109.9 (43.3)
Mean maximum °F (°C)	61.2 (16.2)	64.2 (17.9)	71.6 (22.0)	79.0 (26.1)	86.0 (30.0)	92.7 (33.7)	100.2 (37.9)	100.4 (38.0)	94.3 (34.6)	84.2 (29.0)	72.5 (22.5)	63.5 (17.5)	101.7 (38.7)
Mean daily maximum °F (°C)	44.6 (7.0)	49.3 (9.6)	56.3 (13.5)	65.8 (18.8)	74.8 (23.8)	83.3 (28.5)	88.3 (31.3)	89.6 (32.0)	80.8 (27.1)	69.1 (20.6)	57.6 (14.2)	47.5 (8.6)	67.3 (19.6)
Daily mean °F (°C)	37.0 (2.8)	40.1 (4.5)	46.4 (8.0)	54.7 (12.6)	63.5 (17.5)	71.4 (21.9)	76.1 (24.5)	76.5 (24.7)	68.0 (20.0)	57.9 (14.4)	48.6 (9.2)	39.7 (4.3)	56.7 (13.7)
Mean daily minimum °F (°C)	31.1 (−0.5)	32.9 (0.5)	38.3 (3.5)	45.0 (7.2)	53.6 (12.0)	60.8 (16.0)	64.4 (18.0)	64.6 (18.1)	56.8 (13.8)	49.5 (9.7)	41.5 (5.3)	33.8 (1.0)	47.7 (8.7)
Mean minimum °F (°C)	15.1 (−9.4)	19.0 (−7.2)	28.2 (−2.1)	36.5 (2.5)	43.9 (6.6)	52.0 (11.1)	57.0 (13.9)	56.5 (13.6)	45.5 (7.5)	37.2 (2.9)	27.7 (−2.4)	19.4 (−7.0)	13.5 (−10.3)
Record low °F (°C)	−8.0 (−22.2)	−7.6 (−22.0)	6.1 (−14.4)	22.3 (−5.4)	35.2 (1.8)	41.0 (5.0)	46.4 (8.0)	46.0 (7.8)	33.3 (0.7)	23.5 (−4.7)	15.3 (−9.3)	0.7 (−17.4)	−8.0 (−22.2)
Average precipitation inches (mm)	3.08 (78.3)	2.96 (75.1)	2.84 (72.2)	2.30 (58.4)	2.22 (56.4)	2.07 (52.6)	1.33 (33.7)	0.77 (19.5)	1.62 (41.1)	2.73 (69.4)	3.15 (80.0)	4.15 (105.3)	29.21 (742.0)
Average precipitation days	9.6	8.8	8.5	8.1	9.5	9.0	3.8	2.9	4.0	9.0	9.7	10.5	93.4
Average relative humidity (%)	80	76	74	69	69	65	59	58	65	75	80	81	71
Mean monthly sunshine hours	93	118	168	201	261	303	338	331	235	167	115	79	2,490
Source: http://climatebase.ru/station/15730/?lang=en

- Avren
- Bagriltsi
- Baratsi
- Blagun
- Boynik
- Bryagovets
- Buk
- Chal
- Chernichevo
- Chernooki
- Dazhdovnik
- Devesilitsa
- Devesilovo
- Doborsko
- Dolna Kula
- Dolni Yurutsi
- Dzhanka
- Egrek
- Edrino
- Golyama Chinka
- Golyam Devesil
- Golyamo Kamenyane
- Gorna Kula
- Gorni Yurutsi
- Grivka
- Guliyka
- Guliya
- Hisar
- Hrastovo
- Kalaydzhievo
- Kamenka
- Kandilka
- Kachulka
- Kovil
- Kozhuhartsi
- Kotlari
- Krasino
- Kaklitsa
- Leshtarka
- Limets
- Lulichka
- Malka Chinka
- Malko Kamenyane
- Malak Devesil
- Metlika
- Moryantsi
- Ovchari
- Oreshari
- Padalo
- Pashintsi
- Pelin
- Perunika
- Podrumche
- Polkovnik Zhelyazovo
- Potocharka
- Potochnitsa
- Ralichevo
- Ribino
- Rogach
- Ruchey
- Samovila
- Sarnak
- Sbor
- Siniger
- Skalak
- Sladkodum
- Slivarka
- Stari Chal
- Strandzhevo
- Strazhets
- Studen Kladenets
- Tintyava (Tırfıllı before 1934)
- Tokachka
- Topolka
- Vransko
- Zvanarka
- Zimornitsa
- Zlatolist
