= Blagun =

Blagun Благун
- Village
- Location within Bulgaria
- Coordinates: 41.3778°N 25.7406°E
- Country: Bulgaria
- Province: Kardzhali Province
- Municipality: Krumovgrad
- Time zone: UTC+2 (EET)
  - Summer (DST): UTC+3 (EEST)

Blagun is a village in Krumovgrad Municipality, Kardzhali Province, southern Bulgaria.

Blagun Glacier on Graham Land, Antarctica is named after the village.

== Landmarks ==
The White River, located about 6 km southeast of neighboring village Chernichevo, is the first river in the Eastern Rhodopes to be included in the ecological network "NATURA 2000." It is known for its distinctive winding course, which creates various shapes called "The meanders of the White River."

Another significant site is the Rock Tomb-Sanctuary near neighboring Rogach, situated 28 km northwest of Blagun. This site is considered sacred by the local people and is also known as Guyo or Kuyo. It is positioned on a rock on the right bank of the Krumovitsa River and features two small, deep indentations on the rock that resemble human footprints. Locals refer to these as "The steps of Ali," named after a Muslim saint.

The Dzhevele protected area, found 34 km north of Perunika, is notable for housing the Turkish hazel, a rare species unique to the Eastern Rhodopes.

To reach the Dzhevele area, visitors can follow a tourist route starting from Rogach. This route passes through Slivarka, which is 33 km to the north and includes the micro-dams known as Slivarka 1 and Slivarka 2. The route then continues to Chal, 40 km further, where the mosque called Koyunonlaru Dzhamisi is located. This mosque is thought to be the oldest in the Eastern Rhodopes.
