= Dolna Kula =

Dolna Kula Долна кула
- Village
- Location within Bulgaria
- Coordinates: 41.5264452°N 25.6118994°E
- Country: Bulgaria
- Province: Kardzhali Province
- Municipality: Krumovgrad
- Elevation: 260 m (850 ft)

Population (2021)
  - Total: 114
- Time zone: UTC+2 (EET)
  - Summer (DST): UTC+3 (EEST)

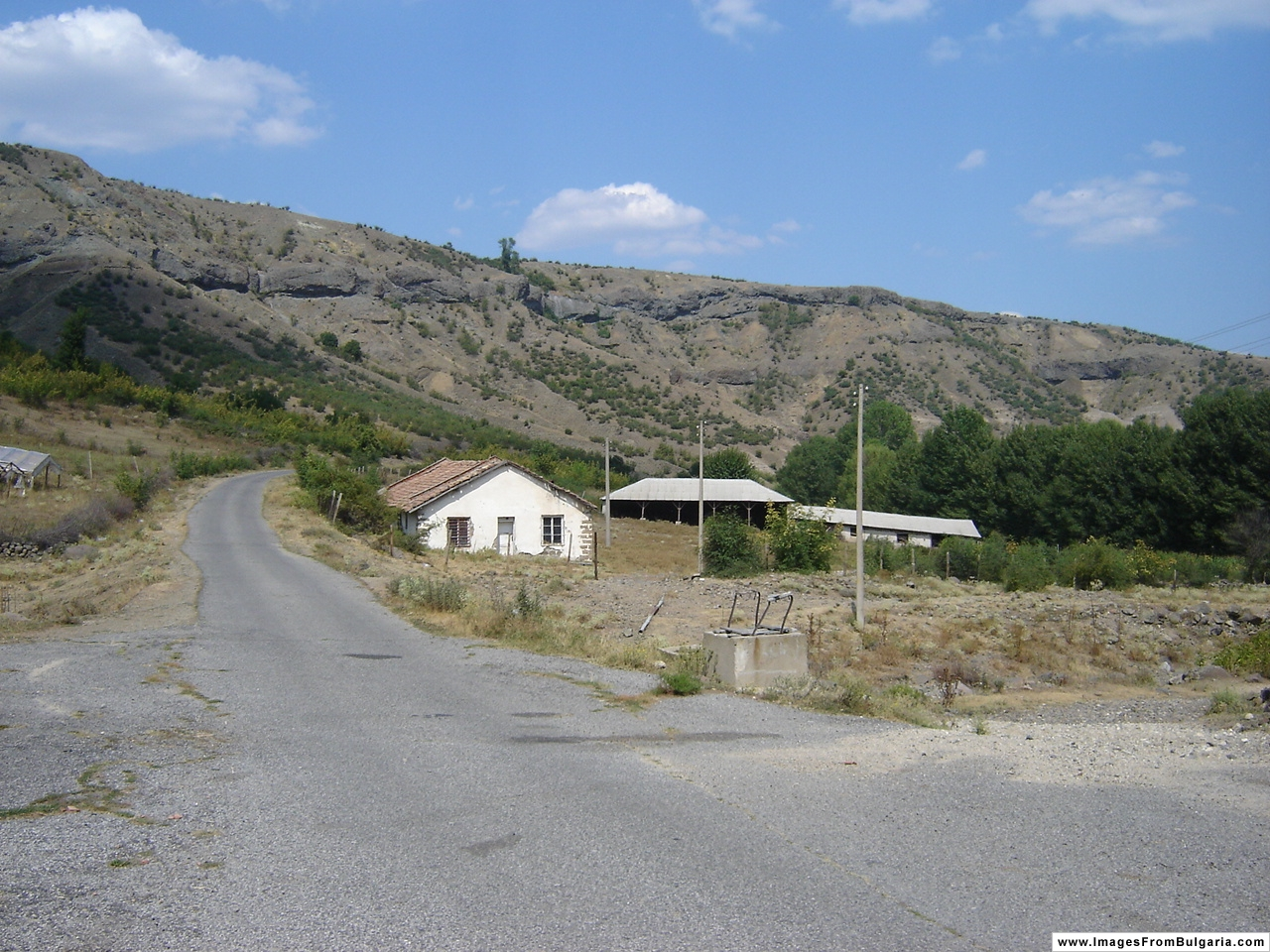
Dolna Kula view

Dolna Kula (Bulgarian: Долна кула) is a village in Kardzhali Province in the very south of Bulgaria, located in the Eastern Rhodopes on the banks of the river Krumovitsa. The majority of its population consists of ethnic Turks. It is located at an elevation of 260m.

== Landmarks ==
The Seytlyar Dzhamisi mosque, located in neighboring village Krumovgrad, is a notable heritage site. Built on the remains of an old wooden mosque from the 16th to 18th centuries, it became central to local life. The mosque's Friday meetings helped establish trade and led to the growth of Krumovgrad and nearby villages. The village is also home to another historical site; a medieval church made of cut stones held together with plaster.

Near Dolna Kula, in the middle stretch of the Krumovitsa River, lies the "Krumovitsa" ornithological area. This location, situated between Gorna Kula and the Dushan Dere River, has several rock formations with distinctive cuts, showing that people lived in the valley long ago. Similar rock formations can be also found near Gorna Kula. The Karamfil Dam can be located at the entrance of Gorna Kula, where fishing is permitted.

Nearby, in Vransko village, roughly 9 km (5.6 miles) southeast, a prehistoric settlement from the Karanovo II culture can be visited. This settlement dates back to about 5,000 BC. Additionally, rock niches associated with rituals have been uncovered in the village of Chaika, which is about 5 km (3 miles) northwest.
