= Dazhdovnik =

Dazhdovnik Дъждовник
- Village
- Location within Bulgaria
- Coordinates: 41.4334667°N 25.6785752°E
- Country: Bulgaria
- Province: Kardzhali Province
- Municipality: Krumovgrad

Population (31 December 2013)
  - Total: 57
- Time zone: UTC+2 (EET)
  - Summer (DST): UTC+3 (EEST)

Dazhdovnik is a village in Krumovgrad Municipality, Kardzhali Province, southern Bulgaria.

== Landmarks ==
Nearby, a Rock Tomb-Sanctuary, situated on a cliff by the right bank of the Krumovitsa River, is found 5 km (3.1 miles) east of Dazhdovnik, in the village of Rogach. This site is deemed sacred, with two small holes in the rock resembling human footprints, referred to as “The steps of Ali,” after a Muslim saint.

Nearby, in the village of Oreshari, roughly 31 km (19.3 miles) to the north, is a protected area known for its rare plant and animal species. This location also includes significant archaeological sites. Among these are the medieval rock monastery called "Reverend Martin’s Hole," a Thracian rock niche site, and a series of caves known as "The Six Caves," which are recognized as one of Bulgaria’s 250 notable caves.

To the north-east, 33 km (20.5 miles) from Dazhdovnik, is Ilia's Field in Glumovo. This site features a memorial dedicated to the 40,000 Thracian refugees who died in the area. The memorial, consisting of a chapel, monument, and fountain, serves as the venue for the National Youth Thracian Fest, or Thracian Child’s Day, held annually on June 1st, aligning with the International Day for the Protection of Children.

Close by, is Yamur Baba's Turban, a revered site among local Muslims. This location includes a symbolic grave where prayers are offered. In neighboring village Avren, just 17 km (10.6 miles) south, several historical sites can be visited. These include the church "St. Nicolaus Wondermaker," a chapel built on the site of a former church in Selishteto, and a monument honoring those who died in the Balkan War.
