= Chernooki =

Chernooki Чернооки
- Village
- Location within Bulgaria
- Coordinates: 41.4333°N 25.7667°E
- Country: Bulgaria
- Province: Kardzhali Province
- Municipality: Krumovgrad
- Elevation: 72 m (236 ft)
- Time zone: UTC+2 (EET)
  - Summer (DST): UTC+3 (EEST)

Chernooki is a village of Krumovgrad Municipality, in Kardzhali Province, southern Bulgaria.

== Landmarks ==
Chernooki's proximity to the municipal center provides access to several historical and cultural sites. These include the remains of a defensive wall from an old fortified village and the mosque “Seytlyar dzhamisi,” significant to the town’s history. The town also houses a museum with over 2,000 exhibits in a building recognized as a cultural monument.

In Glumovo village, about 28 km (17.4 miles) northeast of Chernooki, Ilia's Field features a memorial dedicated to the 40,000 Thracian refugees who perished there. The memorial includes a chapel, a monument, and a fountain, and is the site of the National Youth Thracian Fest, or Thracian Child’s Day, held annually on June 1st, which is also the International Day for the Protection of Children.

The medieval fortress on the steep hill called Dzheneve, located 10 km (6.2 miles) north of neighboring village Perunika, has been a site of historical interest. Artifacts such as coins, fragments of medieval pottery, and iron objects have been discovered there. A perennial spring flows beneath the fortress.

In Rogach village, approximately 14 km (8.7 miles) northwest of Chernooki, the Rock Tomb-Sanctuary is located on a cliff by the right bank of the Krumovitsa River. This site is considered sacred, featuring two small rock holes that resemble human footprints, known as “The steps of Ali,” after a Muslim saint.
