= Kaklitsa =

Kaklitsa Къклица
- Village
- Location within Bulgaria
- Coordinates: 41.4167°N 25.7500°E
- Country: Bulgaria
- Province: Kardzhali Province
- Municipality: Krumovgrad
- Elevation: 300 m (980 ft)

Population
  - Total: 80
- Time zone: UTC+2 (EET)
  - Summer (DST): UTC+3 (EEST)

Kaklitsa is a village in Krumovgrad Municipality, Kardzhali Province, southern Bulgaria.

== Landmarks ==
Located roughly 16 kilometers (9.9 miles) to the north-east of neighboring village of Rogach, an archaeological site known as Guyo (or Kuyo) can be located. This rock sanctuary is situated on the right bank of the Krumovitsa River and is considered sacred to locals.

The Sanctuary of Orpheus, situated near the village of Tatul approximately 41 kilometers (25.5 miles) from Kaklitsa, is another historical site. This complex features an ancient pagan temple alongside a medieval fortress. The site includes a tomb carved into the rock, which is reached via a formal staircase, and is considered the symbolic grave of Orpheus.

Further north, roughly 5 kilometers (3.1 miles) from neighboring village Bivolyane, the Harman Kaya sanctuary is located. This site contains millennium-old remains of a Thracian town as well as the Emala Baba religious complex, built between 1362 and 1402. The complex is thought to have been associated with Fatima, the daughter of the Prophet Muhammad.

In the neighboring village of Zvezdel, situated roughly 28 kilometers (17.4 miles) to the north-west in the Stramni Rid mountain range, one can find a medieval fortress and a tower from the 11th to 12th centuries. An 11th-century icon was discovered there, featuring a foundation made of deer bone, with meticulously crafted medallions depicting saints and clasps adorned with gold and silver inlays.
