= Doborsko =

Doborsko Доборско
- Village
- Location within Bulgaria
- Country: Bulgaria
- Province: Kardzhali Province
- Municipality: Krumovgrad
- Elevation: 1,050 m (3,440 ft)
- Time zone: UTC+2 (EET)
  - Summer (DST): UTC+3 (EEST)

Doborsko is a village in Krumovgrad Municipality, Kardzhali Province, southern Bulgaria.

== Landmarks ==
The Rock Tomb-Sanctuary located in neighboring village Rogach, is situated 9 km (5.6 miles) southwest of Doborsko. This archaeological location, found on a cliff by the Krumovitsa River, is revered for its two small rock impressions, known locally as "The Steps of Ali." These marks, resembling human footprints, are considered sacred by the local community.

In the village of Glumovo, 21 km (13 miles) northeast of Doborsko, a memorial honors 40,000 Thracian refugees who died in the area. The memorial includes a chapel, a monument, and a fountain and is the site of the National Youth Thracian Festival, or Thracian Child’s Day, held annually on June 1st, aligning with the International Day for the Protection of Children.

Krumovgrad is home to several important cultural and historical sites. The Seytlyar Dzhamisi mosque is a key landmark believed to be essential for the town’s history. The town also boasts a museum with over 2,000 exhibits housed in a building designated as a cultural monument. Additionally, the church of St. Ivan Rilski, built in 1934, is recognized for its architectural significance.
