= Polkovnik Zhelyazovo =

Village in southern Bulgaria

Polkovnik Zhelyazovo Полковник Желязово
- Village
- Location within Bulgaria
- Coordinates: 41.4635°N 25.6725°E
- Country: Bulgaria
- Province: Kardzhali Province
- Municipality: Krumovgrad
- Elevation: 260 m (850 ft)

Population (2015)
  - Total: 559
- Time zone: UTC+2 (EET)
  - Summer (DST): UTC+3 (EEST)
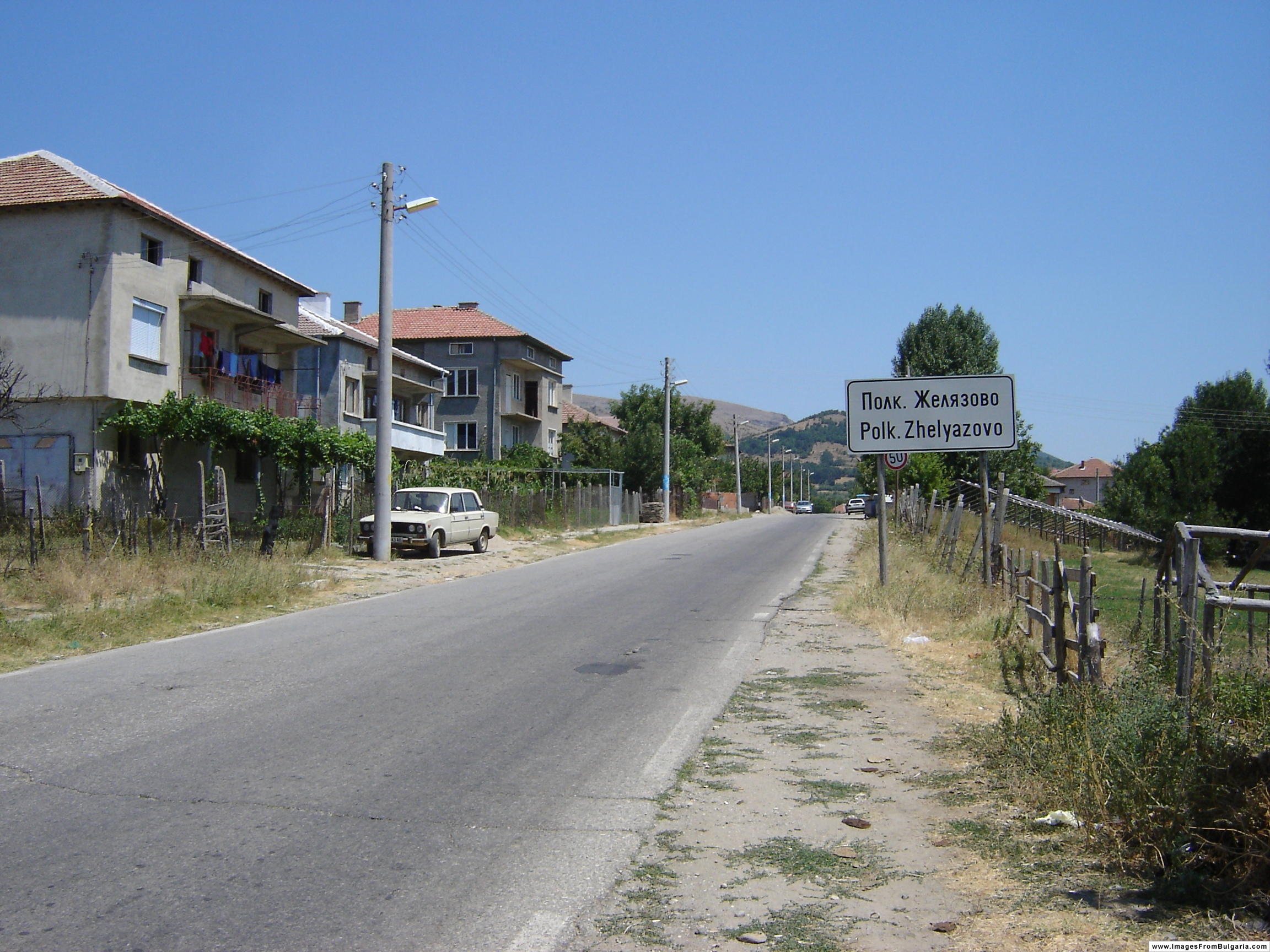
- The main road in the village

Polkovnik Zhelyazovo (Bulgarian: Полковник Желязово, Turkish: Kıylakü) is a village in Krumovgrad municipality, Kardzhali Province, located in the Eastern Rhodope Mountains of southern Bulgaria.

== Landmarks ==
3km (4.8 miles) Northwest, near neighboring village Vransko, a prehistoric village can be located, known as Keremid Cheli. The discoveries within this village date back to the middle Neolithic period (around 5,000 B.C).
