= Zlatolist =

Zlatolist may refer to

- In Bulgaria (written in Cyrillic as Златолист):
  - Zlatolist, Blagoevgrad Province - a village in the Sandanski municipality, Blagoevgrad Province
  - Zlatolist, Kardzhali Province - a village in the Krumovgrad municipality, Kardzhali Province
