= Avren =

Avren (Bulgarian: Аврен) may refer to two villages in Bulgaria:

- Avren, Varna Province
- Avren, Kardzhali Province
