= Ludwig Tolumov and Ivan Serafimov =

Bulgarian serial killers

- Born: Ludwig Slavov Tolumov; 1950 (age 75–76); Duvanli, Plovdiv Province, People's Republic of Bulgaria Ivan Serafimov Ivanov; 1956; Duvanli, Plovdiv Province, People's Republic of Bulgaria; July 15, 2000 (aged 43–44) near Tsarimir, Plovdiv Province, Bulgaria; Cause of death: Gunshot wounds
- Other names: "The Sour" "The Sweet"
- Conviction: Murder
- Penalty: Life imprisonment

Details
- Victims: 5 (including Serafimov)
- Span of crimes: 1996–2000
- Country: Bulgaria
- States: Plovdiv, Stara Zagora
- Date apprehended: 2000 (Tolumov)/Killed before being considered a suspect (Serafimov)
- Imprisoned at: Plovdiv Central Prison

Ludwig Slavov Tolumov (Bulgarian: Лудвиг Славов Толумов; born 1950) and Ivan Serafimov Ivanov (Bulgarian: Иван Серафимов Иванов; 1956 – July 15, 2000), known jointly as The Sour and The Sweet (Bulgarian: Соленото и Сладкото), were a pair of Bulgarian robbers, rapists and serial killers who, in the span of two months in 2000, murdered 3 people and robbed several others. Serafimov, who was solely responsible for a murder in 1996, was shot by his partner Tolumov, who himself was subsequently apprehended and sentenced to life imprisonment.

== Biographies ==
=== Early lives ===
Both Tolumov and Serafimov were born in the little village of Duvanli, where they were childhood friends, but eventually separated after the former moved to Hisar so he could live with new wife, Penka, who later gave birth to three children. Not long after, Tolumov went on to temporarily live in Germany, before moving to Namibia. In the meantime, Serafimov became a habitual criminal, spending a total of 15 years behind bars after 8 consecutive sentences for aggravated robbery. While imprisoned, he earned the nickname "The Sweet" because of his ability to sweet talk and his love for sweets.

After many years, while Serafimov was serving his 8th sentence for robbery in the Plovdiv Prison, he reunited with Tolumov, who was imprisoned for theft. During this prison stint, they decided to form their deadly criminal duet. After Serafimov's release in March 2000, he returned to a life of crime, now aided by his partner.

=== First murder ===
On May 13, 2000, a couple, consisting of 19-year-old Ruzhdiye Useinova from Pravoslaven and 20-year-old Sevgin Myumyun from Voden, had decided to go to a disco in the "Mogilata" complex near the village of Varbitsa, Haskovo Province. They had stopped at a petrol station near Byala Reka to fill up their car, before continuing on their journey, only to stop again to the side of the road 20 minutes after midnight, so they could talk and kiss each other. Suddenly, from the darkness the silhouettes of two men appeared, who immediately attacked the couple without saying a word. The criminals broke the car's window and with slaps and kicks pulled out Myumyun and Useinova from the vehicle. They tried to attack the girl, whose boyfriend tried to defend her. However, Myumyun was beaten harshly, before being shot in the eye-socket and the spine. They lied to the girl that they had only knocked him out, and he'd be awake after 3–4 hours. The men then robbed the corpse of his gold earrings and rings, his telephone and cassette player, and then dragged the body to some bushes by the road. Tolumov and Serafimov then forced the shocked Useinova into the car, driving her to a small chapel called "St. Elijah", where they brutally beat and subsequently raped her, one after the other.

After the brutal deed, they proceeded to stab her 8 times in the neck, breasts and stomach before fleeing the scene, thinking they had eliminated their only witness, relying on the fact that the authorities might think that the murders were a result from a love-related drama between the two. However, Useinova had miraculously survived, the blade from the knife just barely missing her external carotid artery. After being unconscious for some time, the she eventually woke up, and managed to crawl to the road after some hours, where she was accidentally found by a Parvomay policeman. Barely managing to utter that she was attacked, she again lapsed into unconsciousness, whereupon the officer immediately brought her to the hospital. During the subsequent search of the area, Myumyun's body was located.

While she was recovering from her injuries in hospital, Useinova was visited by the now-retired police sketch artist Atanas Marincheshki, to whom she described the attackers. The man managed to produce an incredibly accurate facial composite of Tolumov, but couldn't do the same for Serafimov, who had tried to hide his face from the victim.

Shortly following the attack, the authorities managed to shorten the suspect circle to 20 names in the criminal registry, with detectives from the National Police's "Murders" Unit aiding the Plovdiv authorities, working 24 hours a day so they could resolve the crime.

=== Robberies and thefts ===
In the meantime, Tolumov and Serafimov continued with the criminal deeds. On June 6, the duo attacked a parked minibus in the "Troyan-Karnare" Pass, stealing combine parts and personal items worth 8265 leva. They threatened the driver, Tanyo Bahchevanski, and proceeded to steal the minibus itself, only to later abandon it.

Five days later, they beat up and robbed a female taxi driver near the village of Belovitsa, and not long after, robbed a man from Sofia along the Trakia motorway. Three weeks after that, near the village of Mihiltsi, they robbed a man and a woman in a parked Moskvitch. The men fired at the car and forced the driver to lay down on the ground, but he managed to flee and call for help at a nearby gas station. Tolumov abandoned his partner, while Serafimov got into the car and raped the woman.

=== Double murder ===
On July 12, a body was found by accident near the architectural-historical memorial "Arch of Freedoms" in Beklemeto Pass. It was later revealed that on that day Tolumov and Serafimov had stopped the car of German tourists Christian Herlem and Heidi Colomb, both from Kassel - near Pavel Banya. There, they killed Herlem and later dropped off his body into the abyss, before taking Colomb to Mount Bratan, where she was reportedly raped. After raping her, both men threw the woman into the nearby swamp, effectively drowning her. Her skull was later located, with parts of her body scattered around the place, most likely by wild animals.

The police quickly contacted German authorities, sending the victims' items to them. In order to capture the bandits, agents from Interpol took action, drawing accurate facial composites of the criminals in accordance to the surviving victims.

== Serafimov's death and Tolumov's capture ==
While the investigators were working on capturing the criminals, distrust began to settle between Tolumov and Serafimov. On July 15, while driving towards Hisarya, the two began arguing. Tolumov, suspecting that his childhood friend was planning to kill him, offered to stop the car. Immediately after this, he pulled out his gun and shot Serafimov, killing him on the spot. He then put his body in the trunk of the car and dropped it off at a ditch near Tsarimir. To erase his traces, he later burned the car.

Between July 19 and 20, a man and a woman working for TV company Evrokom, while trying to shoot footage for a film, accidentally found the body of a man who was dressed in a sailor's shirt and looked to be around his 40s. He had gunshot wounds to his back and chest area. Later fingerprint examinations proved that it was indeed Ivan "The Sweet" Serafimov.

The police then proceeded to question his friends, calling in a total of 9 people, among them two women and a Vietnamese man. The deceased eerily matched the description of one of the perpetrators who had attacked Ruzhdiye Useinova, while his friend Ludwig Tolumov looked like the other man. After a brief investigation, it was concluded that they had done a number of violent crimes, and that Tolumov had killed his partner. He was arrested in Hisarya soon after, without offering any resistance. Ludwig confessed to the rape of Useinova and the thefts, but denied the murders, only admitting to that of Serafimov, claiming to have done it to protect the lives of his family and other people.

== Evidence ==
The authorities had strong evidence, including DNA samples, to convict Tolumov. It was determined that a pistol with a silencer was used in the murders of Herlem and Serafimov, while in the murder of Myumyun - an MP 40. In accordance to the different situations, the criminals would use either of the two weapons. The MP 40 was later found on August 10 in Tolumov's home.

Although apparent that Serafimov was the main act in the murders, Tolumov acted as his accomplice without hesitation. Not only this, but the former is also thought to be responsible for the 1996 murder of a woman named Elena Filipova, in her home near the Plovdiv Boulevard "Maritsa".

According to the psychoanalysis of Ludwig Tolumov, he is egocentric, selfish and demands control of others, feeling good when he controls the course of action and dominates over everybody else. He is devoid of any regret and likes to show off, but also stands out with a high degree of self-control.

== Trial and sentence ==
During Tolumov's trial, he stated that the murder charges should be dropped, as he had acted in self-defence. After hearing this, Embie Myumyun, Sevgin's mother, began cussing at him. Sitting next to her was the still shocked Ruzhdiye Useinova. On July 3, 2003, Tolumov was sentenced to the harshest sentence available for aggravated murder - life imprisonment. He would have to serve it in the Plovdiv Central Prison under a special regime. In his last words to the court, he said the following:

"I'm sorry for some of the deeds, but I'm not responsible for the robbery and murder of Sevgin. I admit to participating in the rape of the girl, but I was forced to do so by Ivan, if it wasn't for me, the girl wouldn't be alive."

The magistrates also gave a guilty verdict over robbing tourists at Beklemeto Pass in June 2000, as well giving an additional 15 years imprisonment for murdering Ivan Serafimov.

== Aftermath ==
On August 11, 2011, Ludwig Tolumov's 22-year-old son, Slavi, was found hanged in the family home in Duvanli. Slavi had lived with his mother's family in Hisar's Catholic district, where his grandfather Milan was looking after him, as his mother was working abroad in Italy. His death was ruled a suicide, most likely due to the fact he couldn't live with the knowledge that his father was a brutal killer. Just a month before, he had moved back to Duvanli and the empty house, which was abandoned after the grandparents had died years before. The villagers noted that he seemed depressed, didn't speak to anyone and refused to go to the café with friends. The boy had worked in Italy as a builder on request by his mother, but he had decided to return to Bulgaria. His mother, Penka, had also lost her other son 2 years before. She currently lives isolated in a monastery. In response to this, Tolumov commented that this ruined his parents, who died during the trial, and that he still keeps the necrologues of his sons. He also said that he keeps regular contact with the priest in Novi Khan, sending him money for his children over Christmas and Easter.

In 2014, Tolumov and another murderer, Dimitar Harakchiev, were awarded compensation of 3000 and 4000 leva following a trial in the Court of Justice of the European Union, due to the bad hygiene, ventilation and other problems which went on in the prison's cells.

While imprisoned, Tolumov began writing an autobiography, detailing all the events of his life leading up to his arrest. He said the book would be called "Chronicles of a Life Sentence". His prison cell is considered lavish, as he has a flat screen TV, coffee machine, radio, a metal fan, renewed window panels and an old typing machine, on which he is currently writing the book.

== See also ==
- List of serial killers by country
