= Skalak =

Skalak may refer to:

== Places ==
- Skalak, Burgas Province, Bulgaria
- Skalak, Kardzhali Province, Bulgaria

== People with the surname ==
- Jiří Skalák (born 1992), Czech football player
- Richard Skalak (1923–1997), American biomedical engineer
