= Avren, Kardzhali Province =

Avren Аврен
- Village
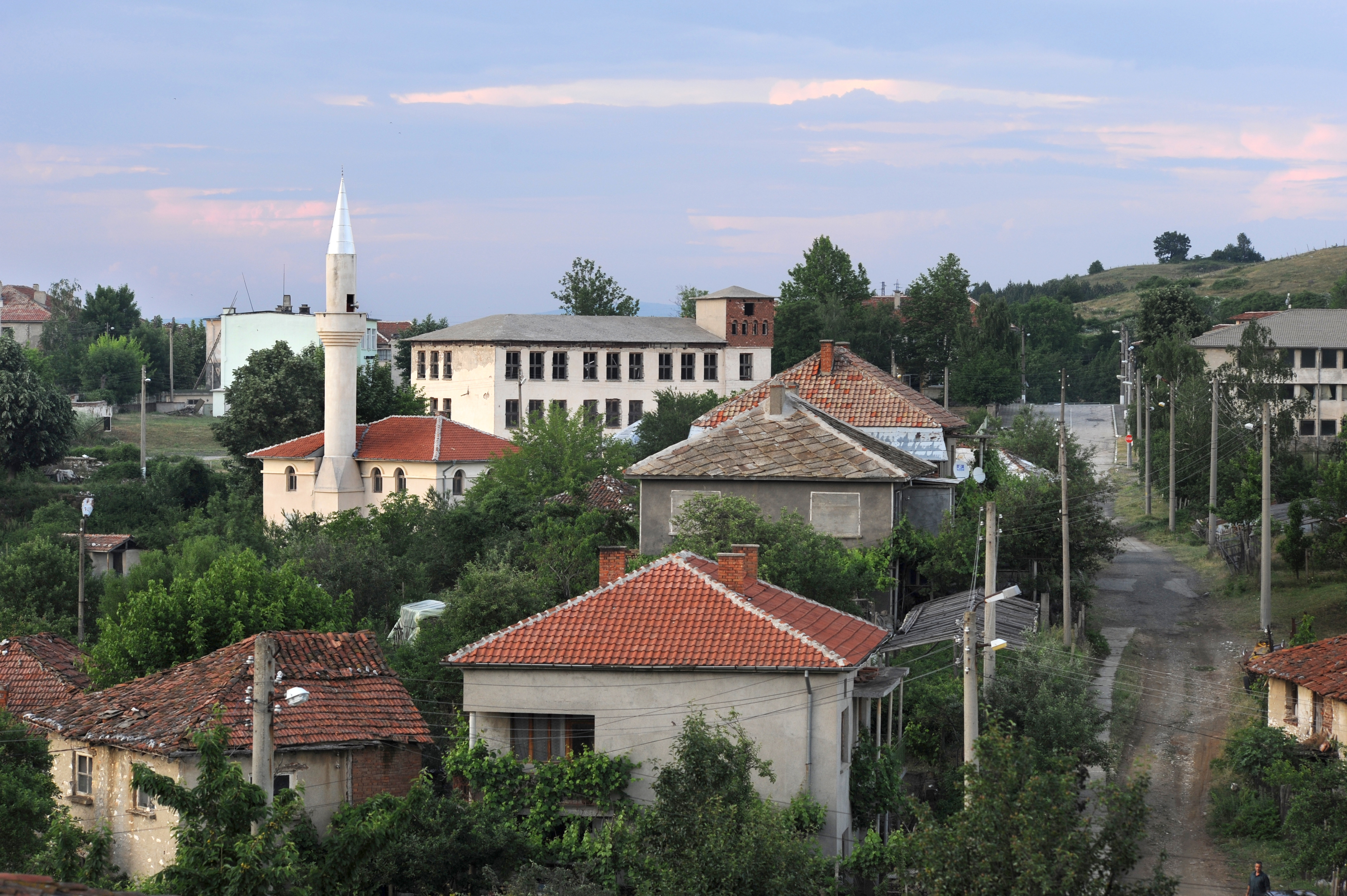
- View of the town from the top

- Location within Bulgaria
- Coordinates: 41.3500°N 25.7167°E
- Country: Bulgaria
- Province: Kardzhali Province
- Municipality: Krumovgrad
- Elevation: 404 m (1,325 ft)
- Time zone: UTC+2 (EET)
  - Summer (DST): UTC+3 (EEST)

Avren is a village in Krumovgrad Municipality, Kardzhali Province, southern Bulgaria. Avren Village is situated in a mountainous region, approximately 4 km from the Greek border. It is about 20 km south of Krumovgrad, around 69 km southeast of the regional center Kardzhali.

== Landmarks ==
The Osogovo and Ryakata rivers flows through the village. To the east and west of the village are the Malka Ryaka and Maglenishka rivers, respectively, which separate Avren from the neighboring villages of Chernichevo and Blagun.

The area around the village is suitable for hunting tourism, with wildlife such as wild boars and deer. Other animals in the region include wolves, foxes, hedgehogs, and, more recently, endangered turtles.

In the village, there is a town hall, a community center, a church, a chapel, a primary school, and a kindergarten. The nearest post office is located in Chernichevo, and the closest general hospital is in Kardzhali.

Culturally, the village is home to several notable sites. The church of St. Nikolai Chudotvorets is a major attraction. Other points of interest include the chapel built where an old church once stood, and the historic church of St. Ilia, which housed the village's first school. There is also a monument dedicated to those who died in the Balkan War and a library called Narodni Buditeli, which serves as a cultural resource for the community.
