= Studen =

Studen may refer to:

== Foods ==
- Aspic, a gelatinous meat dish known in Eastern Europe as Studen.

== Places ==
- Studen, Bern, a municipality in the canton of Bern, Switzerland
- Studen, Schwyz, a village in the municipality of Unteriberg, Schwyz, Switzerland
- Studen Kladenets, a reservoir in Bulgaria
- Studen Kladenets (village), a village in Bulgaria

== People ==
- Nenad Studen, a Bosnian Serb professional footballer
