= Gorna Kula =

Gorna kula Горна кула
- Village
- Location within Bulgaria
- Coordinates: 41.4954°N 25.6176°E
- Country: Bulgaria
- Province: Kardzhali Province
- Municipality: Krumovgrad
- Elevation: 229.49 m (752.9 ft)

Population (2021)
  - Total: 316
- Time zone: UTC+2 (EET)
  - Summer (DST): UTC+3 (EEST)

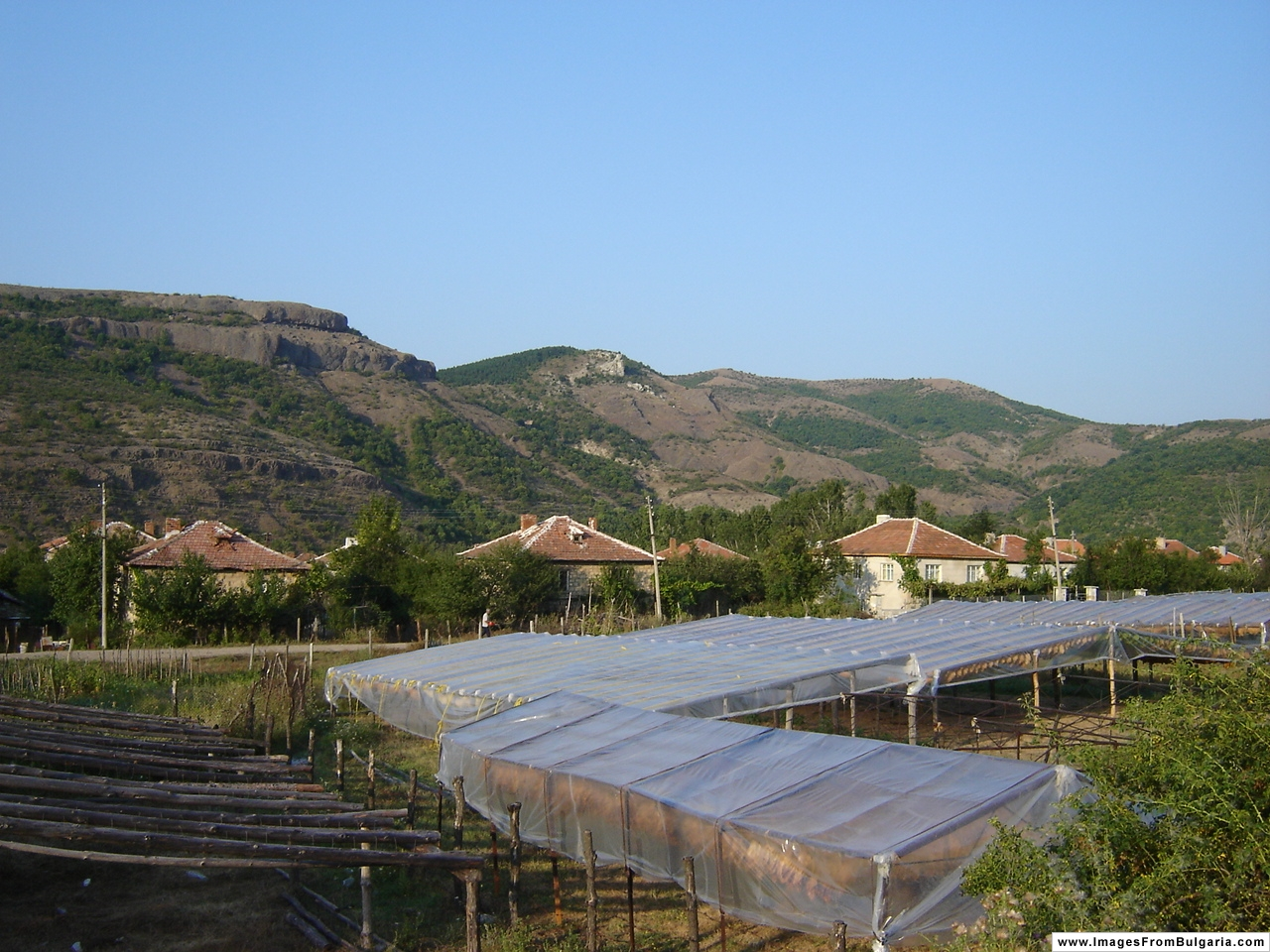
Gorna kula view

Gorna kula (Bulgarian: Горна кула) is a village in Kardzhali Province in the very south of Bulgaria, located in the Eastern Rhodopes on the banks of the river Krumovitsa. The majority of its population consists of ethnic Turks.

== Landmarks ==
The village is situated near the Krumovitsa River, which flows through a ornithological area known as Krumovitsa. This area encompasses the middle course of the river between Gorna Kula and the Dushan Dere River.

Additionally, in the neighboring village of Vransko, located roughly 6 kilometers (3.7 miles) southeast, visitors can explore a prehistoric settlement associated with the Karanovo culture, dating back to the middle Neolithic period around 5000 BC. To the west, about 10 kilometers (6.2 miles) away in the village of Chaika, rock niches linked to ritual activities have been discovered.

In neighboring village Krumovgrad, the medieval nave church, constructed from hewn stones bonded with plaster, represents a notable historical site in the town's central area. The mosque known as Seytlyar Dzhamisi is another key cultural landmark. It was erected on the site of a previous wooden mosque from the 16th to 18th centuries.
