= Kovil (village) =

Kovil Ковил
- Village
- Location within Bulgaria
- Coordinates: 41.5167°N 25.6667°E
- Country: Bulgaria
- Province: Kardzhali Province
- Municipality: Krumovgrad
- Elevation: 400 m (1,300 ft)

Population
  - Total: 40
- Time zone: UTC+2 (EET)
  - Summer (DST): UTC+3 (EEST)

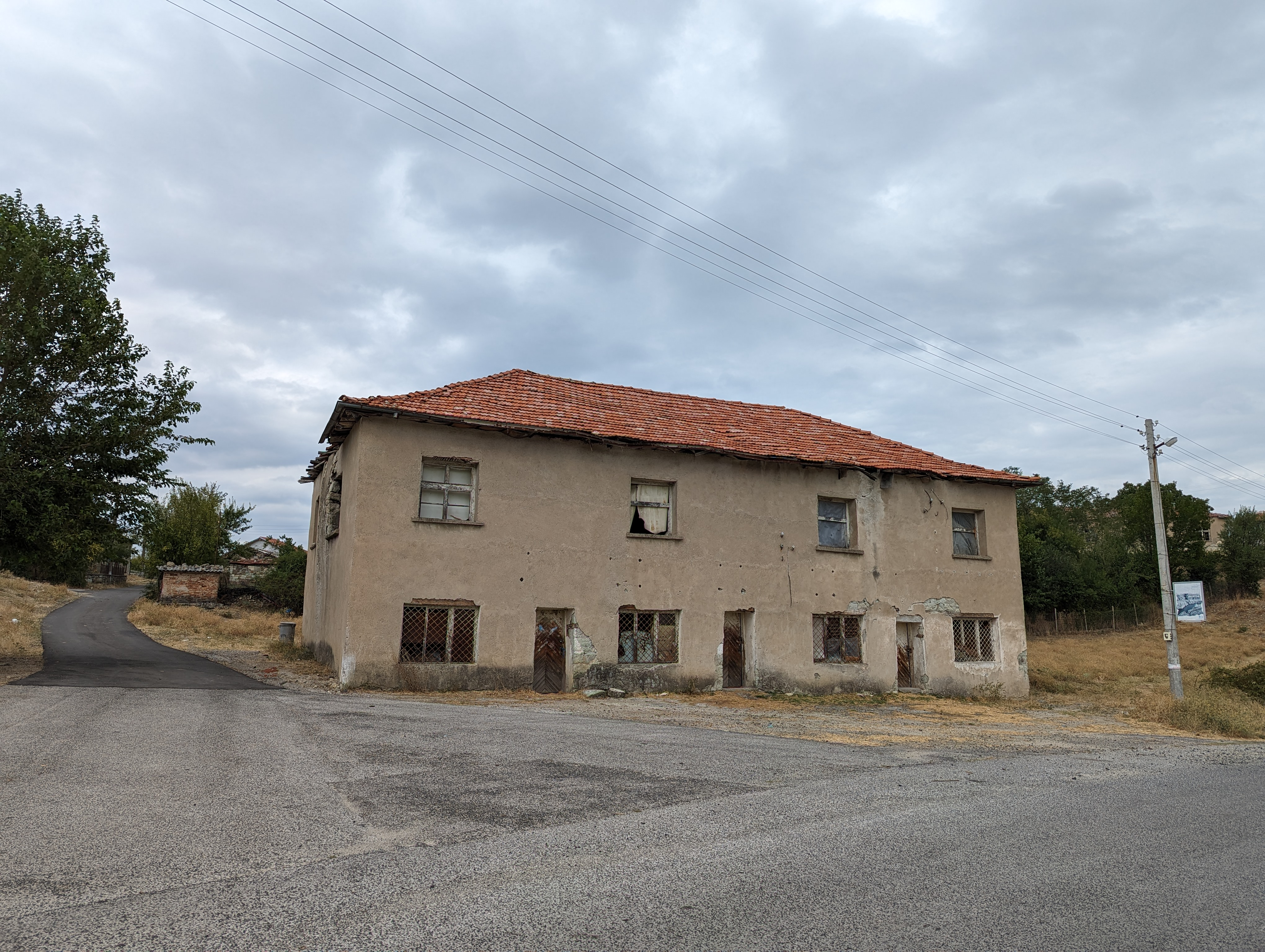
Abandoned house in Kovil

Kovil is a village in Krumovgrad Municipality, Kardzhali Province, southern Bulgaria.
