= Sladkodum =

Sladkodum Сладкодум
- Village
- Location within Bulgaria
- Coordinates: 41.6000°N 25.6833°E
- Country: Bulgaria
- Province: Kardzhali Province
- Municipality: Krumovgrad
- Time zone: UTC+2 (EET)
  - Summer (DST): UTC+3 (EEST)

Sladkodum is a village located in Krumovgrad Municipality, Kardzhali Province, southern Bulgaria.
