= Golyamo Kamenyane =

Golyamo Kamenyane Голямо Каменяне
- Village
- Location within Bulgaria
- Coordinates: 41.4167°N 25.7167°E
- Country: Bulgaria
- Province: Kardzhali Province
- Municipality: Krumovgrad
- Elevation: 440 m (1,440 ft)

Population (2021)
  - Total: 199
- Time zone: UTC+2 (EET)
  - Summer (DST): UTC+3 (EEST)

Golyamo Kamenyane is a village in Krumovgrad Municipality, Kardzhali Province, southern Bulgaria.

The village is located 10 km southeast of Krumovgrad, 58 km in the same direction of the regional center Kardzhali and about 299 km southeast of the capital Sofia city. The village is only 14 km away from the national border with Greece. Golyamo Kamenyane is located in a mountainous area at an altitude of about 440 m. It is part of the Mediterranean climate zone which determines the mild winter and the hot summer.

Golyamo Kamenyane has relatively good infrastructure. The roads are in good condition, it has water, electricity, supply, and regular bus transport that connects it with the municipality center Krumovgrad.
