= Potochnitsa =

Potochnitsa Поточница Adaköy
- Village
- Location within Bulgaria
- Coordinates: 41.6083°N 25.6750°E
- Country: Bulgaria
- Province: Kardzhali Province
- Municipality: Krumovgrad
- Elevation: 181 m (594 ft)

Population (2021)
  - Total: 230
- Time zone: UTC+2 (EET)
  - Summer (DST): UTC+3 (EEST)

Potochnitsa is a village in Krumovgrad Municipality, Kardzhali Province, southern Bulgaria. The village is a Turkish-origin settlement and is referred to as Ada or Adaköy in local Turkish.
