= Kachulka =

Kachulka Качулка
- Village
- Location within Bulgaria
- Coordinates: 41.5000°N 25.6667°E
- Country: Bulgaria
- Province: Kardzhali Province
- Municipality: Krumovgrad
- Elevation: 439 m (1,440 ft)

Population (2013)
  - Total: 24
- Time zone: UTC+2 (EET)
  - Summer (DST): UTC+3 (EEST)

Kachulka ( Bulgarian: Качулка ) is a village in Krumovgrad Municipality, Kardzhali Province, southern Bulgaria.

== Geography ==
The village of Kachulka is located in a mountainous region.

== Population ==
Number and share of ethnic groups according to the 2011 population census:

	Number	Share (in %)
Total	24	100.00
Bulgarians	0	0.00
Turks	18	75
Romani	0	0.00
Others	0	0.00
Do not self-define	0	0.00
Did not answer	6	25
