= Golyama Chinka =

Golyama Chinka Голяма Чинка
- Village
- Location within Bulgaria
- Coordinates: 41.4000°N 25.5500°E
- Country: Bulgaria
- Province: Kardzhali Province
- Municipality: Krumovgrad
- Elevation: 474 m (1,555 ft)

Population (2021)
  - Total: 194
- Time zone: UTC+2 (EET)
  - Summer (DST): UTC+3 (EEST)

Golyama Chinka is a village in Krumovgrad Municipality, Kardzhali Province, southern Bulgaria.
