= Hrastovo =

Hrastovo Храстово
- Village
- Location within Bulgaria
- Coordinates: 41.4000°N 25.6167°E
- Country: Bulgaria
- Province: Kardzhali Province
- Municipality: Krumovgrad
- Elevation: 600 m (2,000 ft)

Population (2013)
  - Total: 53
- Time zone: UTC+2 (EET)
  - Summer (DST): UTC+3 (EEST)

Hrastovo is a village in Krumovgrad Municipality, Kardzhali Province, southern Bulgaria.
