= Kozhuhartsi =

Kozhuhartsi Кожухарци
- Village
- Location within Bulgaria
- Coordinates: 41.6000°N 25.7500°E
- Country: Bulgaria
- Province: Kardzhali Province
- Municipality: Krumovgrad
- Elevation: 340 m (1,120 ft)

Population
  - Total: 4
- Time zone: UTC+2 (EET)
  - Summer (DST): UTC+3 (EEST)

Kozhuhartsi is a village in Krumovgrad Municipality, Kardzhali Province, southern Bulgaria.
