= Devesilitsa =

Devesilitsa Девесилица
- Village
- Location within Bulgaria
- Country: Bulgaria
- Province: Kardzhali Province
- Municipality: Krumovgrad
- Elevation: 330 m (1,080 ft)
- Time zone: UTC+2 (EET)
  - Summer (DST): UTC+3 (EEST)

Devesilitsa is a village in Krumovgrad Municipality, Kardzhali Province, southern Bulgaria.
