= Gorni Yurutsi =

Gorni Yurutsi Горни Юруци
- Village
- Location in Bulgaria
- Coordinates: 41°20′53″N 25°55′05″E
- Country: Bulgaria
- Province: Kardzhali Province
- Municipality: Krumovgrad
- Time zone: UTC+2 (EET)
  - Summer (DST): UTC+3 (EEST)

Gorni Yurutsi is a village in Krumovgrad Municipality, Kardzhali Province, southern Bulgaria.
