= Egrek =

Egrek Егрек
- Village
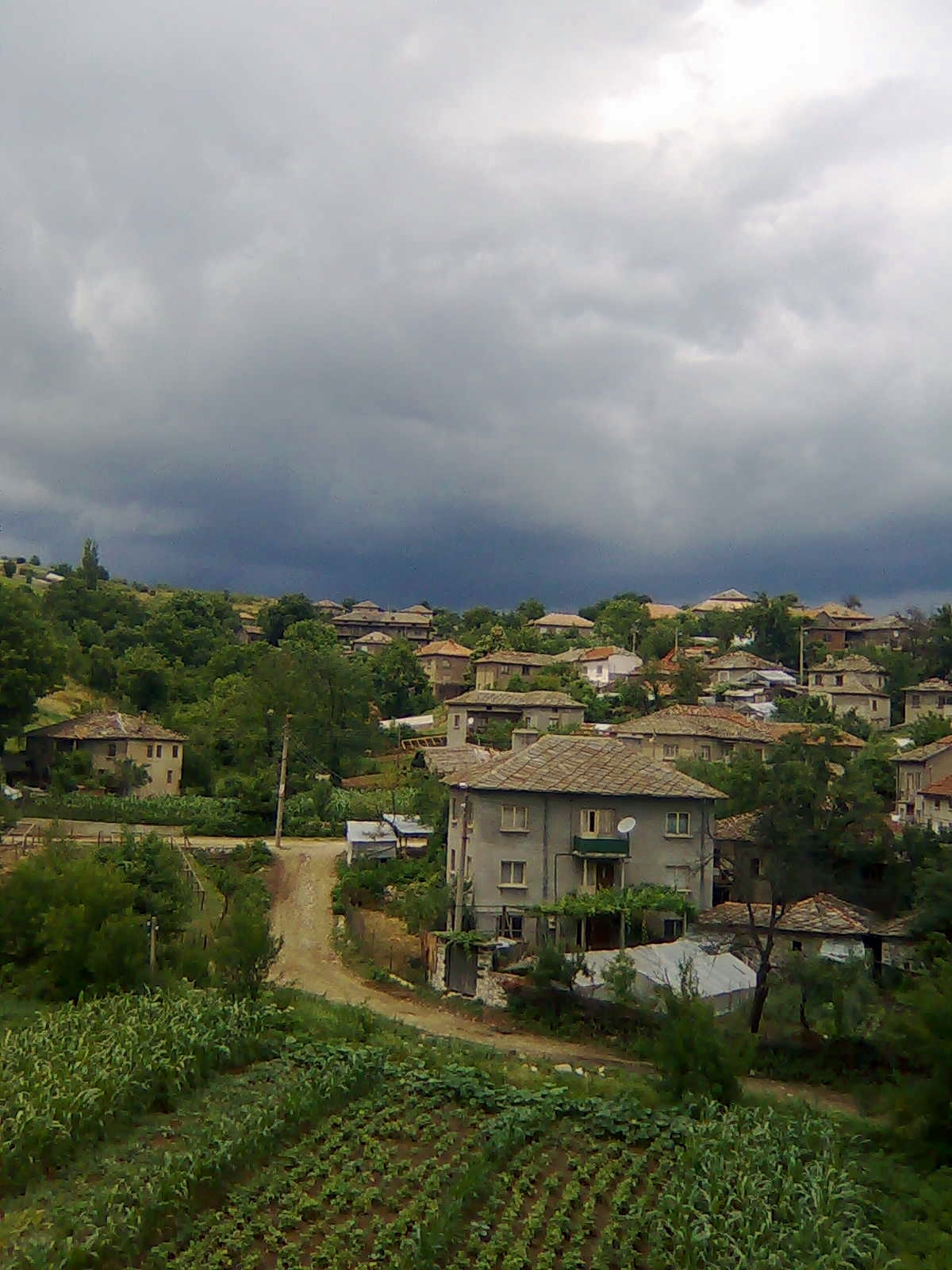
- Egrek, Kardzhali Province, Bulgaria

- Location within Bulgaria
- Coordinates: 41.3333°N 25.5833°E
- Country: Bulgaria
- Province: Kardzhali Province
- Municipality: Krumovgrad
- Elevation: 516 m (1,693 ft)

Population (2021)
  - Total: 402
- Time zone: UTC+2 (EET)
  - Summer (DST): UTC+3 (EEST)

Egrek is a village in Krumovgrad Municipality, Kardzhali Province, southern Bulgaria.
