= Bagriltsi =

Bagriltsi Багрилци
- Village
- Location within Bulgaria
- Coordinates: 41.4667°N 25.7833°E
- Country: Bulgaria
- Province: Kardzhali Province
- Municipality: Krumovgrad
- Elevation: 234.68 m (769.9 ft)
- Time zone: UTC+2 (EET)
  - Summer (DST): UTC+3 (EEST)

Bagriltsi is a village in Krumovgrad Municipality, Kardzhali Province, southern Bulgaria. It is situated in the region Khaskovo in Bulgaria.

== Landmarks ==
Near Krumovgrad Thracian sanctuaries and tombs can be located, as well as cemeteries and medieval castles. The area also offers the opportunity for developing rural and eco tourism.
