= Potocharka =

Potocharka Поточарка
- Village
- Location within Bulgaria
- Coordinates: 41.6000°N 25.6667°E
- Country: Bulgaria
- Province: Kardzhali Province
- Municipality: Krumovgrad
- Elevation: 268 m (879 ft)

Population (2021)
  - Total: 214
- Representing a 4.3% increase in population since 2011 (137)
- Time zone: UTC+2 (EET)
  - Summer (DST): UTC+3 (EEST)

Potocharka is a village in Krumovgrad Municipality, Kardzhali Province, southern Bulgaria.
