= Limets =

Limets Лимец
- Village
- Location within Bulgaria
- Coordinates: 41.3667°N 25.6333°E
- Country: Bulgaria
- Province: Kardzhali Province
- Municipality: Krumovgrad
- Elevation: 460 m (1,510 ft)

Population
  - Total: 70
- Time zone: UTC+2 (EET)
  - Summer (DST): UTC+3 (EEST)

Limets is a village in Krumovgrad Municipality, Kardzhali Province, southern Bulgaria.
