= Pashintsi =

Pashintsi Пашинци
- Village
- Location within Bulgaria
- Coordinates: 41.3500°N 25.5167°E
- Country: Bulgaria
- Province: Kardzhali Province
- Municipality: Krumovgrad
- Elevation: 499 m (1,637 ft)

Population (2021)
  - Total: 379
- Time zone: UTC+2 (EET)
  - Summer (DST): UTC+3 (EEST)

Pashintsi is a village in Krumovgrad Municipality, Kardzhali Province, southern Bulgaria.
