= Malko Kamenyane =

Malko Kamenyane Малко Каменяне
- Village
- Location within Bulgaria
- Coordinates: 41.4167°N 25.7500°E
- Country: Bulgaria
- Province: Kardzhali Province
- Municipality: Krumovgrad
- Elevation: 303 m (994 ft)

Population (2021)
  - Total: 66
- Time zone: UTC+2 (EET)
  - Summer (DST): UTC+3 (EEST)

Malko Kamenyane is a village in Krumovgrad Municipality, Kardzhali Province, southern Bulgaria.
