= Podrumche =

Podrumche Подрумче
- Village
- Location within Bulgaria
- Coordinates: 41.4167°N 25.7500°E
- Country: Bulgaria
- Province: Kardzhali Province
- Municipality: Krumovgrad
- Elevation: 410 m (1,350 ft)

Population (2021)
  - Total: 431
- A population increase of nearly 100 since 2001 (339)
- Time zone: UTC+2 (EET)
  - Summer (DST): UTC+3 (EEST)

Podrumche is a village in Krumovgrad Municipality, Kardzhali Province, southern Bulgaria.
