= Ralichevo =

Ralichevo Раличево
- Village
- Location within Bulgaria
- Coordinates: 41.3833°N 25.5000°E
- Country: Bulgaria
- Province: Kardzhali Province
- Municipality: Krumovgrad
- Elevation: 550 m (1,800 ft)

Population (2021)
  - Total: 73
- Time zone: UTC+2 (EET)
  - Summer (DST): UTC+3 (EEST)

Ralichevo is a village in Krumovgrad Municipality, Kardzhali Province, southern Bulgaria.
