= Guliyka =

Guliyka Гулийка
- Village
- Location within Bulgaria
- Coordinates: 41.4500°N 25.7333°E
- Country: Bulgaria
- Province: Kardzhali Province
- Municipality: Krumovgrad
- Elevation: 309 m (1,014 ft)

Population
  - Total: 130
- Time zone: UTC+2 (EET)
  - Summer (DST): UTC+3 (EEST)

Guliyka is a village in Krumovgrad Municipality, Kardzhali Province, southern Bulgaria.
