= Kandilka =

Kandilka Кандилка
- Village
- Location within Bulgaria
- Coordinates: 41.4167°N 25.6000°E
- Country: Bulgaria
- Province: Kardzhali Province
- Municipality: Krumovgrad
- Elevation: 289 m (948 ft)

Population (2021)
  - Total: 208
- Time zone: UTC+2 (EET)
  - Summer (DST): UTC+3 (EEST)

Kandilka is a village in Krumovgrad Municipality, Kardzhali Province, southern Bulgaria.
