= Baratsi =

Baratsi Бараци
- Village
- Location within Bulgaria
- Coordinates: 41.5167°N 25.6333°E
- Country: Bulgaria
- Province: Kardzhali Province
- Municipality: Krumovgrad
- Elevation: 307 m (1,007 ft)
- Time zone: UTC+2 (EET)
  - Summer (DST): UTC+3 (EEST)

Baratsi is a village in Krumovgrad Municipality, Kardzhali Province, southern Bulgaria.
