= Malak Devesil =

Malak Devesil Малък Девесил
- Village
- Location within Bulgaria
- Coordinates: 41.3500°N 25.7167°E
- Country: Bulgaria
- Province: Kardzhali Province
- Municipality: Krumovgrad
- Elevation: 440 m (1,440 ft)

Population
  - Total: 450
- Time zone: UTC+2 (EET)
  - Summer (DST): UTC+3 (EEST)

Malak Devesil is a village in Krumovgrad Municipality, Kardzhali Province, southern Bulgaria.
