= Stari Chal =

Stari Chal Стари чал
- Village
- Location within Bulgaria
- Coordinates: 41.5833°N 25.6333°E
- Country: Bulgaria
- Province: Kardzhali Province
- Municipality: Krumovgrad
- Time zone: UTC+2 (EET)
  - Summer (DST): UTC+3 (EEST)

Stari Chal is a village in Krumovgrad Municipality, Kardzhali Province, southern Bulgaria.
