= Golyam Devesil =

Golyam Devesil Голям Девесил
- Village
- Location within Bulgaria
- Coordinates: 41.3428°N 25.6477°E
- Country: Bulgaria
- Province: Kardzhali Province
- Municipality: Krumovgrad

Population (2021)
  - Total: 77
- Time zone: UTC+2 (EET)
  - Summer (DST): UTC+3 (EEST)

Golyam Devesil is a village in Krumovgrad Municipality, Kardzhali Province, southern Bulgaria.
