= Dolni Yurutsi =

Dolni Yurutsi Долни Юруци
- Village
- Location within Bulgaria
- Coordinates: 41.3612°N 25.925547°E
- Country: Bulgaria
- Province: Kardzhali Province
- Municipality: Krumovgrad
- Elevation: 376 m (1,234 ft)
- Time zone: UTC+2 (EET)
  - Summer (DST): UTC+3 (EEST)

Dolni Yurutsi is a village in Krumovgrad Municipality, Kardzhali Province, southern Bulgaria.
