= Dzhanka =

Dzhanka Джанка
- Village
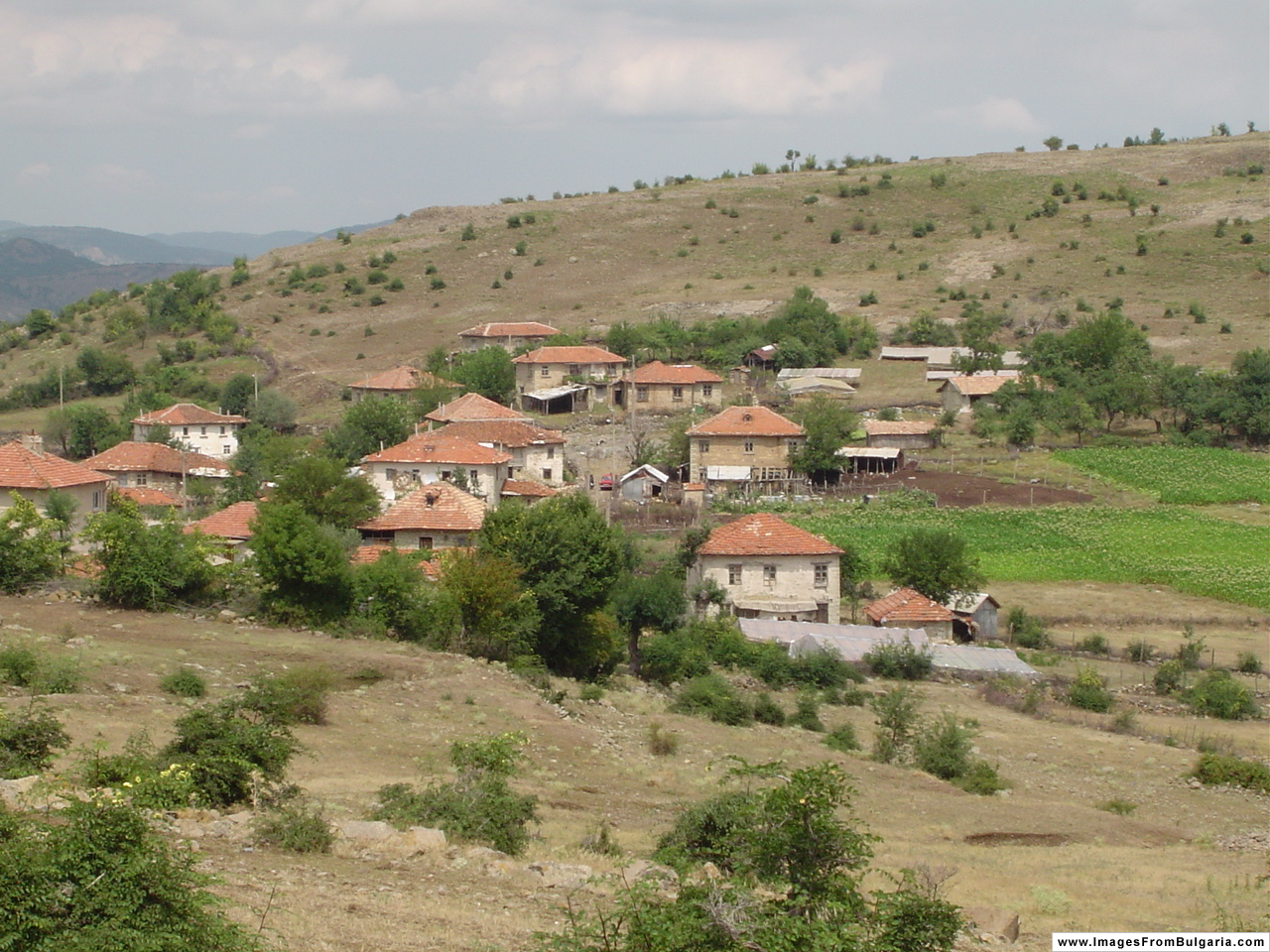
- Dzhanka village

- Location within Bulgaria
- Coordinates: 41°33′N 25°40′E
- Country: Bulgaria
- Province: Kardzhali
- Municipality: Krumovgrad

Government
  - Mayor: Hamdi Hasan
- Elevation: 298 m (978 ft)

Population (2021)
  - Total: 118

Dzhanka (Bulgarian: Джанка, "damson") is a village in Krumovgrad municipality, Kardzhali Province in the very south of Bulgaria, located in the Eastern Rhodopes. The majority of its population consists of ethnic Turks.

As of 2021 the village's population is 118 and the mayor is Hamdi Hasan. It lies at 41°33′N 25°40′E at 298 m above sea level.

== Landmarks ==
In the neighboring village of Kovil, about 5 km (3 miles) south of Dzhanka, an old Thracian site from the late Bronze and early Iron Age is present. This sanctuary is set among white volcanic rocks on a rocky ridge. Many of the rocks have been carved with various features used for religious activities.

Dzhanka has a historical rock tomb in its center. This tomb, cut into white volcanic rock, stands out from the surrounding land. It has a roughly shaped entrance leading to a burial chamber with a trapezoidal layout. There was once a narrow entrance connecting both parts, but only remnants remain.

In the Dzhanka area, a common tourist attraction is known simply as "The Waterfall," being a natural landmark and the tallest waterfall in the Kardzhali protected region. This waterfall is 25 meters high and is a prominent feature of the Dushan Dere River.

Just outside the village, in Kalvacha area, eleven rock niches carved into the west side of a cliff can be seen. These niches are high up on the right side of a ravine and are hard to reach when the ravine has water. They are visible from the main road that runs over the village.

== Images ==
Around Dzhanka village

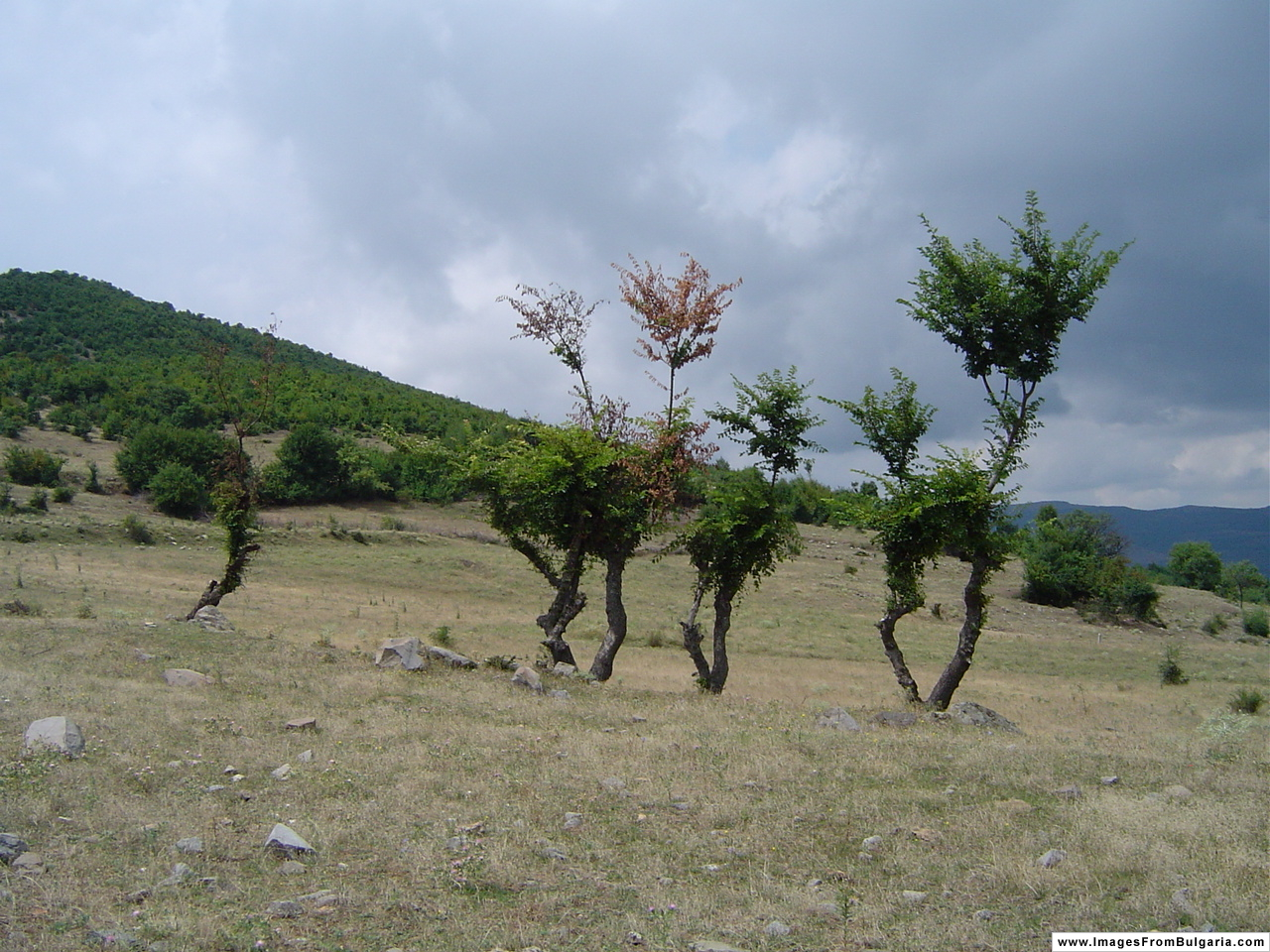
Around Dzhanka village

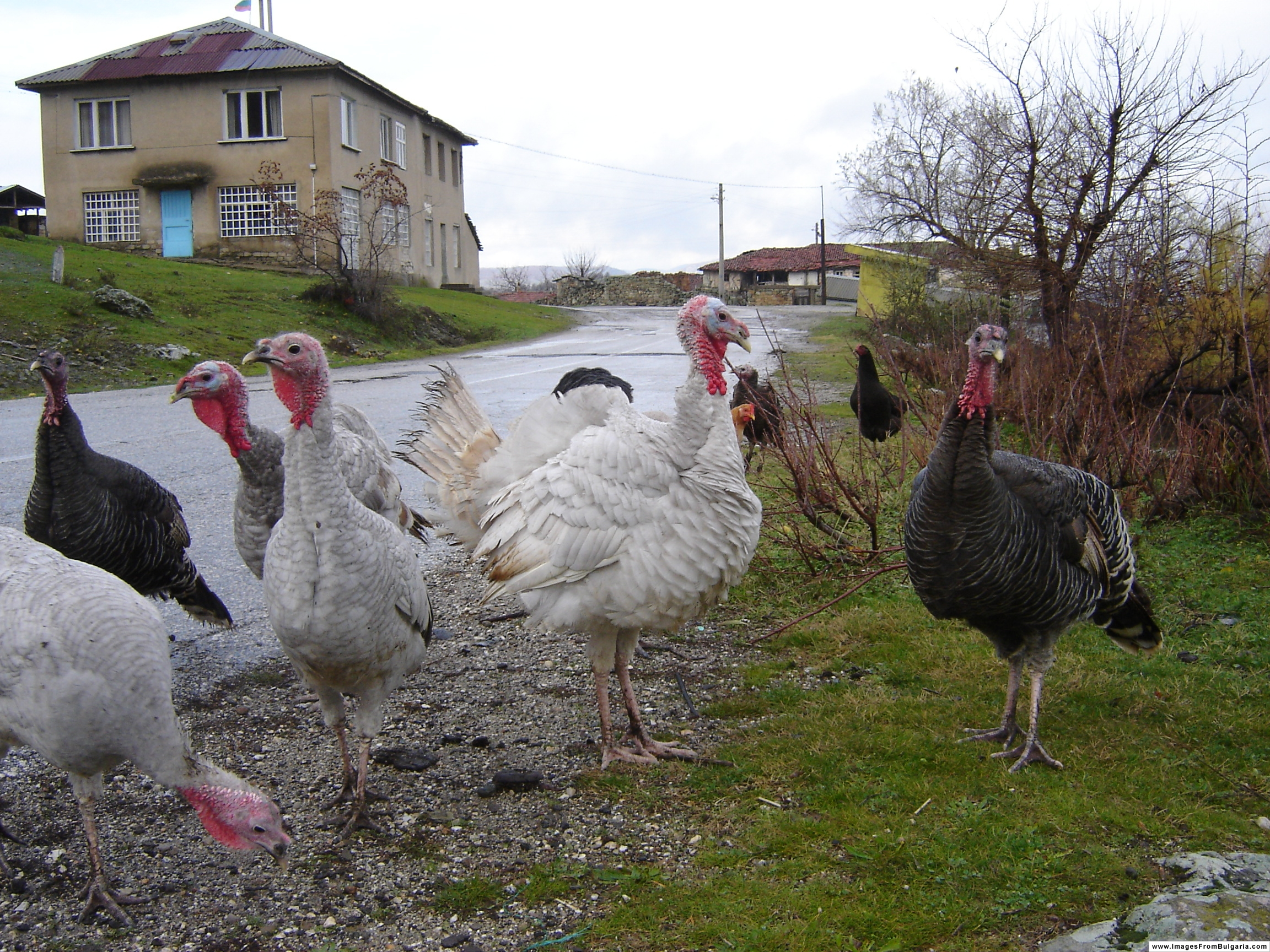
Turkeys in Dzhanka village
