= Guliya =

Guliya Гулия
- Village
- Location within Bulgaria
- Coordinates: 41.4189°N 25.6842°E
- Country: Bulgaria
- Province: Kardzhali Province
- Municipality: Krumovgrad
- Elevation: 488 m (1,601 ft)

Population (2021)
  - Total: 60
- Time zone: UTC+2 (EET)
  - Summer (DST): UTC+3 (EEST)

Guliya is a village in Krumovgrad Municipality, Kardzhali Province, southern Bulgaria.
