= Zlatolist, Kardzhali Province =

Coordinates: 41°31′N 25°38′E

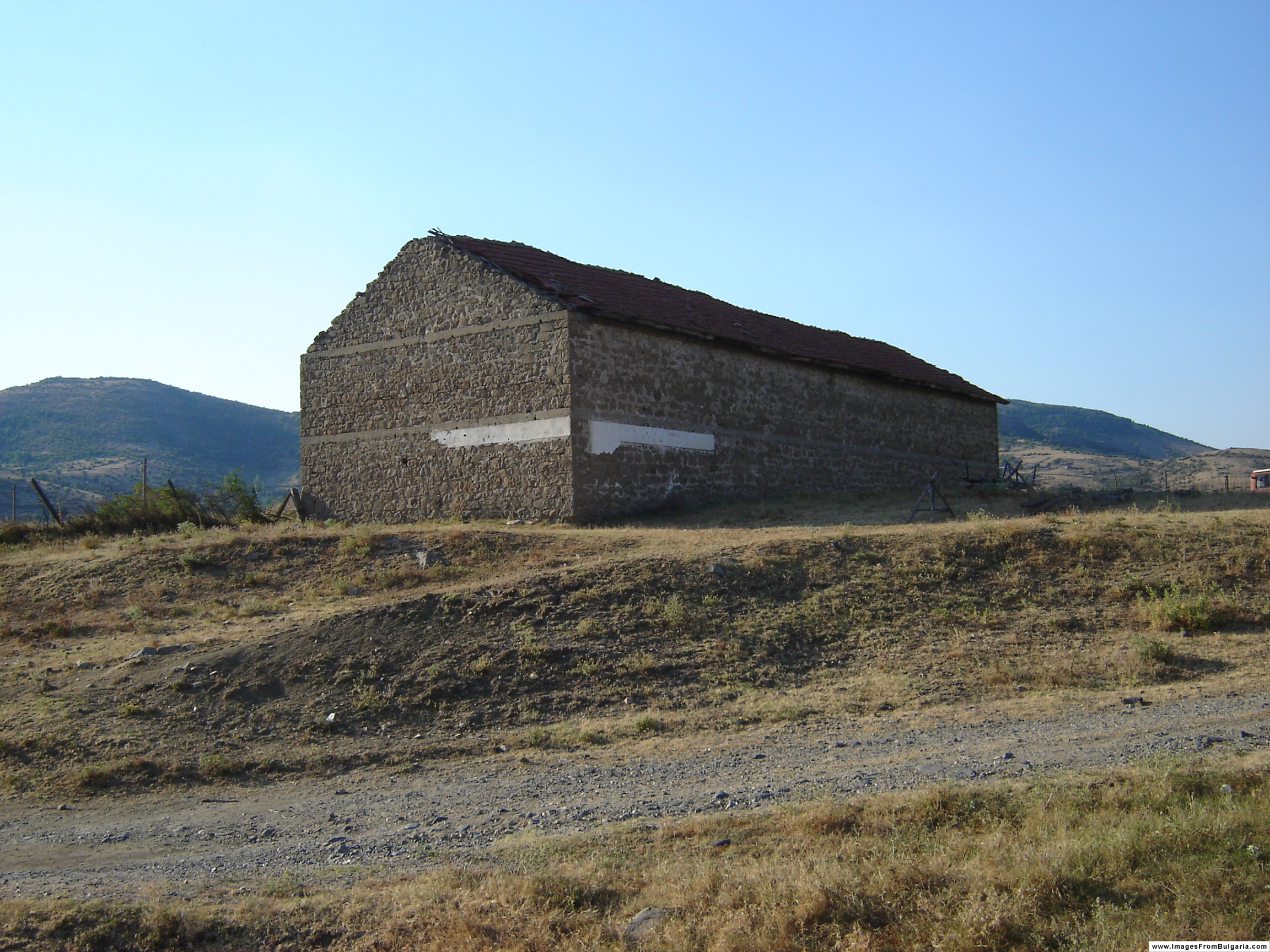
Old building

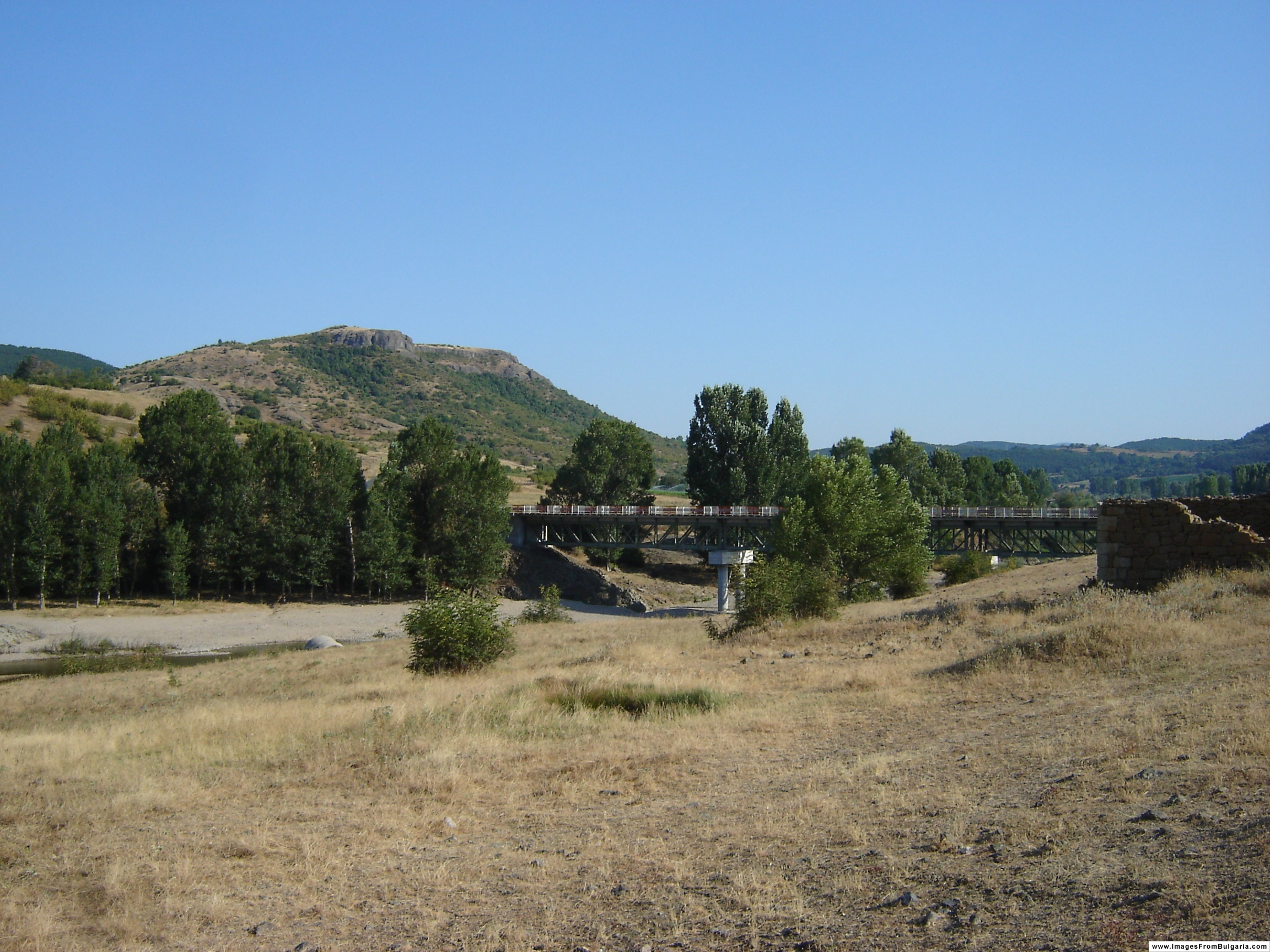
This iron bridge above Krumovitsa river connect Zlatolist with the rest of the world

Zlatolist (Bulgarian: Златолист) is a village in southern Bulgaria, located in the Krumovgrad municipality of the Kardzhali Province.

It is situated in the Eastern Rhodopes on the banks of the Krumovitsa River. The majority of its population consists of ethnic Turks.

Zlatolist Hill on Trinity Peninsula in Antarctica is named after the village.
