= Ovchari =

Ovchari Овчари
- Village
- Location within Bulgaria
- Coordinates: 41.4500°N 25.6500°E
- Country: Bulgaria
- Province: Kardzhali Province
- Municipality: Krumovgrad
- Elevation: 300 m (980 ft)

Population (2013)
  - Total: 146
- Time zone: UTC+2 (EET)
  - Summer (DST): UTC+3 (EEST)

Ovchari is a village in Krumovgrad Municipality, Kardzhali Province, southern Bulgaria.
