= Kamenka, Bulgaria =

Kamenka Каменка
- Village
- Location within Bulgaria
- Coordinates: 41.4670°N 25.6830°E
- Country: Bulgaria
- Province: Kardzhali Province
- Municipality: Krumovgrad
- Elevation: 250 m (820 ft)

Population
  - Total: 68
- Time zone: UTC+2 (EET)
  - Summer (DST): UTC+3 (EEST)

Kamenka is a village in Krumovgrad Municipality, Kardzhali Province, southern Bulgaria.
