= Studen Kladenets (village) =

Studen Kladenets Студен кладенец
- Village
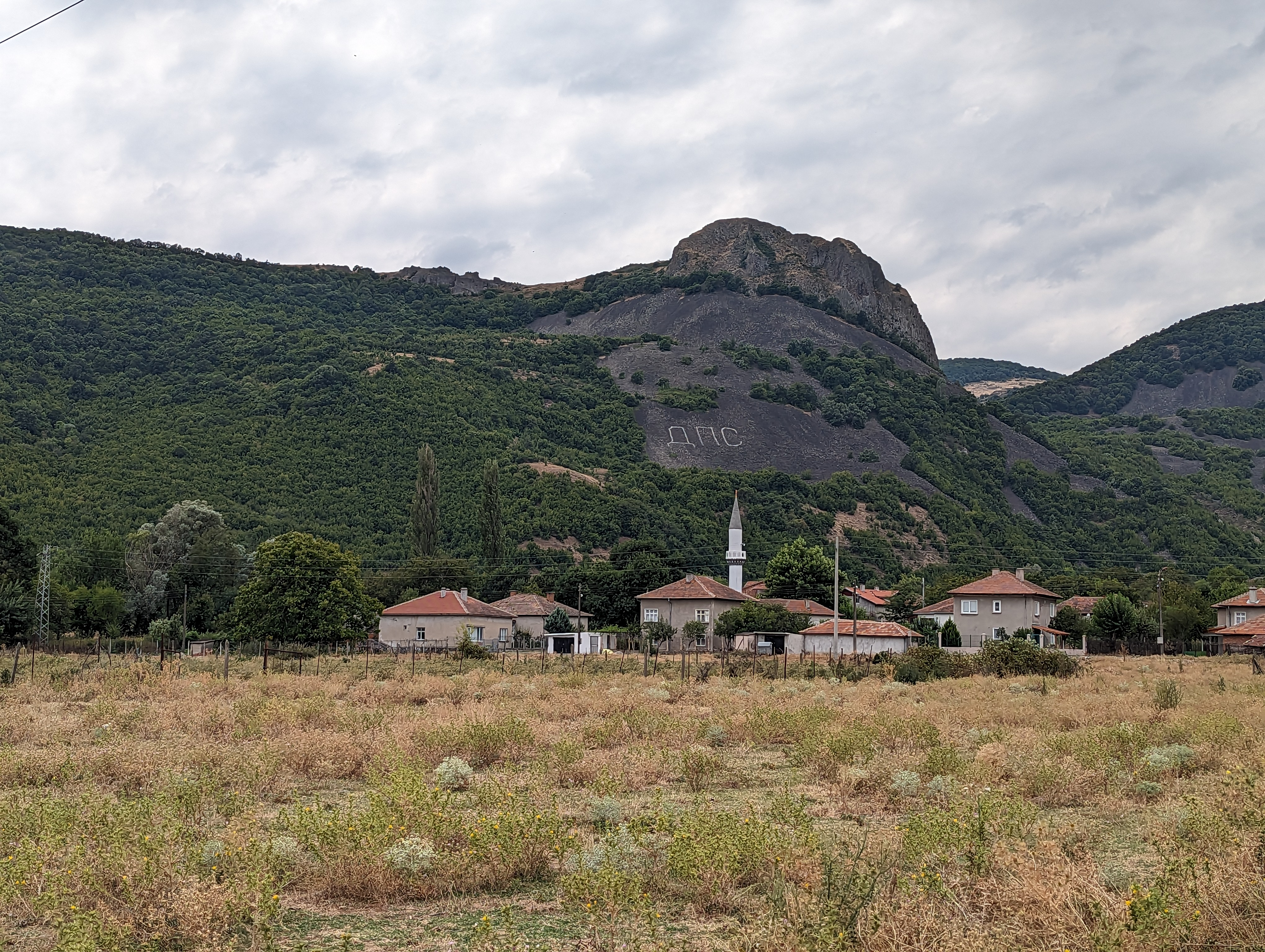

- Location within Bulgaria
- Coordinates: 41.6000°N 25.6500°E
- Country: Bulgaria
- Province: Kardzhali Province
- Municipality: Krumovgrad
- Time zone: UTC+2 (EET)
  - Summer (DST): UTC+3 (EEST)

Studen Kladenets is a village in Krumovgrad Municipality, Kardzhali Province, southern Bulgaria.
