= Chernichevo, Kardzhali Province =

Village in southern Bulgaria

Chernichevo Черничево
- Village
- Location within Bulgaria
- Coordinates: 41.34956°N 25.77753°E
- Country: Bulgaria
- Province: Kardzhali Province
- Municipality: Krumovgrad
- Elevation: 620 m (2,030 ft)
- Time zone: UTC+2 (EET)
  - Summer (DST): UTC+3 (EEST)

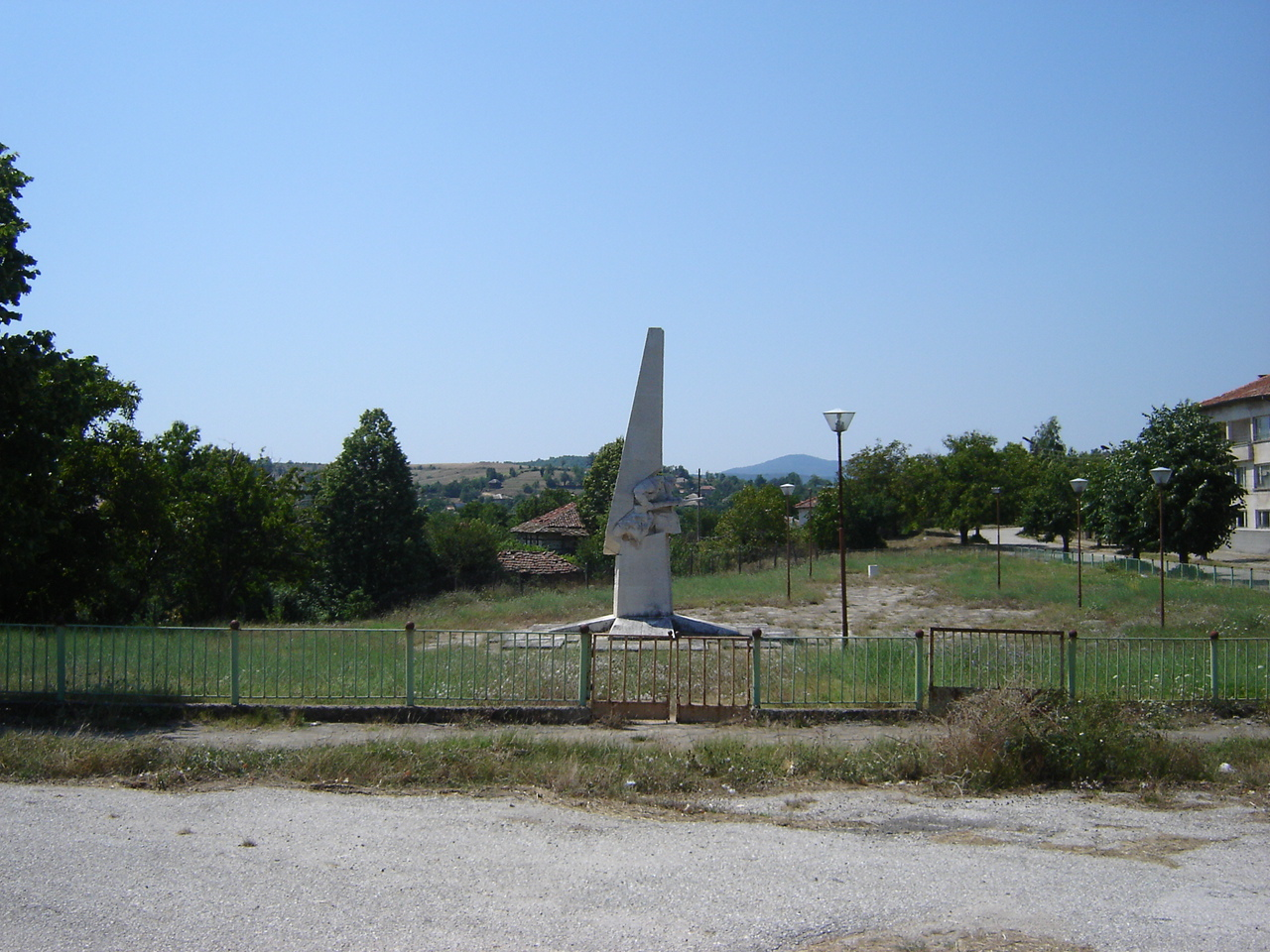
The memorial of the victims from 1913

Chernichevo (Bulgarian: Черничево) is a village in southern Bulgaria, located in the municipality of Krumovgrad in the Kardzhali Province. It is situated in the Eastern part of Rhodope Mountains, near the border with Greece. Its original Bulgarian name is "Dunyata" (Bulgarian: Дунята). The correct geographical location of Chernichevo is 41° 21' N, 25° 47' E.

== History ==
=== Ancient times and Middle Ages ===
Chernichevo is located in a region with an ancient history and rich past. Near the settlement there are seven Thraciandolmens. The Bulgarian archeologist Georgi Nekhrizov identifies Eastern Rhodopi region (citing Chernichevo) as an area with a distinct dolmen building style, which is distinguished from the typical Thracian tradition.

During the Middle Ages the Rhodopes were a battlefield of many wars between the Eastern Roman Empire and the Bulgarian Empire for influence in the Balkans. In these wars the local Bulgarian population supported the army of Bulgaria. In the Latin-Bulgarian conflict the local population supported the Bulgarian forces too. Geoffrey de Villehardouin claims that the local Bulgarians in the Southern Rhodopi killed in a battle Marquis Boniface of Montferrat who was the king of Thessaloniki.

Later, in mid 14th century, the region was attacked by Turkish troops, which made their first significant appearance in Europe in these years. Near Chernichevo there are ruins of an old village, a medieval fortress and a monastery, destroyed probably during the Ottoman invasion.

=== Ottoman rule and strife for liberation ===
During the Ottoman rule, a part of the population of Chernichevo adopted Islam. A few of the village's neighborhoods were inhabited by Muslims, and a few neighborhoods by Christians, both speaking a Bulgarian dialect. In 1848 the Christian community built an Orthodox church called "St. Atanasios" (Bulgarian: "Свети Атанасий"). At the end of 19th century the Bulgarians - Christians in Chernichevo established a secret section of Internal Macedonian Revolutionary Organization.

During the Balkan Wars the village suffered from ethnic and religious tensions. According to Bulgarian academician Lyubomir Miletich's book The Destruction of Thracian Bulgarians in 1913, in the summer and the autumn of 1913 nearly 100 Christian residents of Chernichevo were killed by the Muslim volunteers from the unrecognized Provisional Government of Western Thrace. Today the memory of the innocent victims is honoured by the big monument in the center of the village. The Bucharest Treaty left the village in the borders of Bulgaria. Some Muslim families, which collaborated with the Provisional Government of Western Thrace, moved to Turkey after the treaty.

=== Modern history ===
Soldiers from Chernichevo participated in the Bulgarian army during the World wars, defending their country. Three soldiers died in the Battle of the River Cherna.

In 1950s Chernichevo became a stage for many border accidents between Bulgarian forces and saboteurs from Greece. On August 21, 1952, the commander of the local border outpost Lieutenant Mladen Kaleev died in а skirmish with Greek infiltrators who had entered Bulgarian territory.

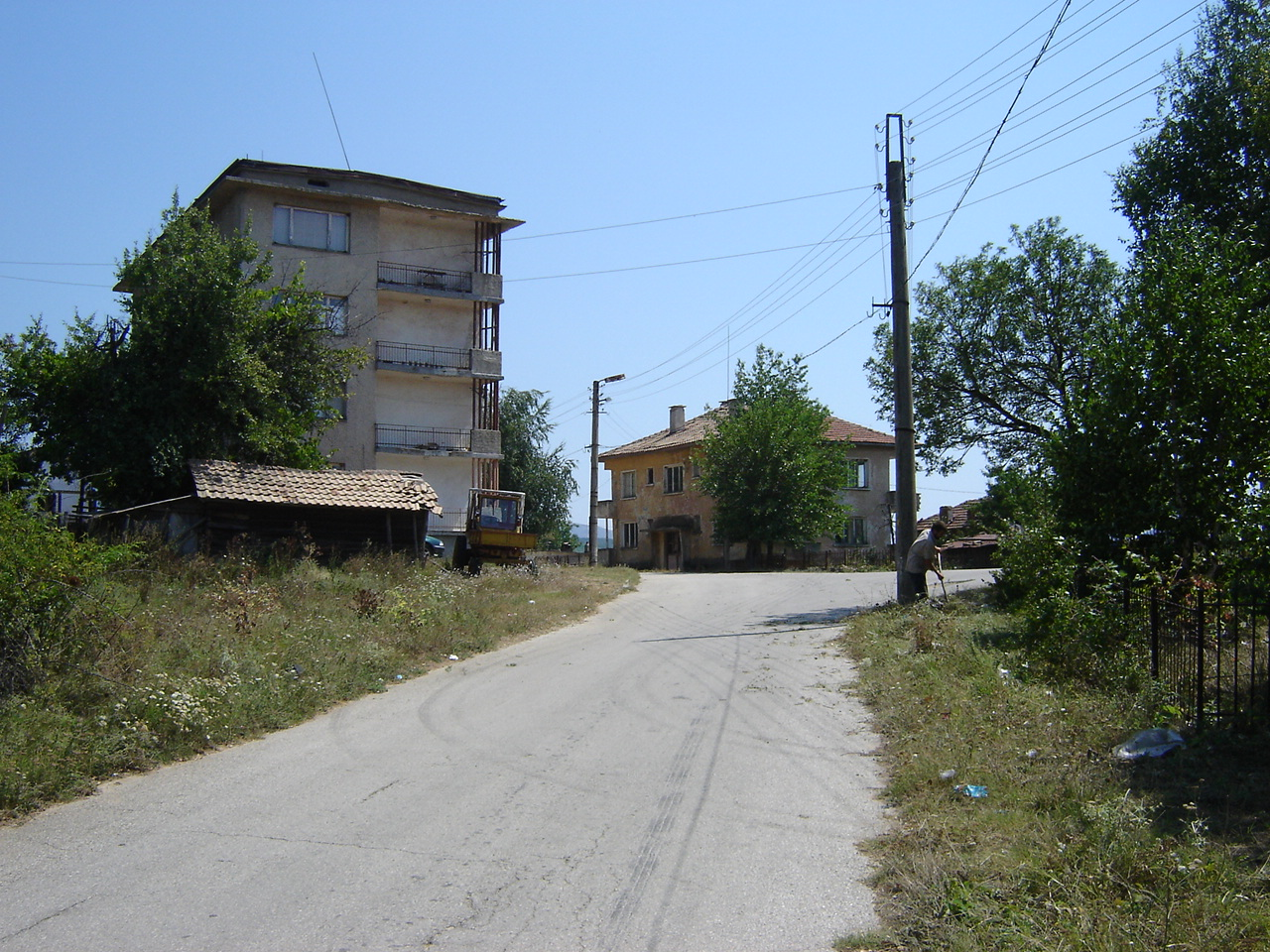
Entering the village

== Traditional culture ==
=== Music and musical instruments ===
The bagpipe and the kaval are traditionally used instruments in Chernichevo. The local music belongs to the Rhodopi folklore region.

=== Weaving ===
The women of Chernichevo used looms to weave blankets, carpets and aprons.

=== Religion ===
In Chernichevo cohabit Bulgarian-speaking people, professing Orthodox Christianity and Sunni Islam.

== Chernichevo today ==
Since the second half of 20th century, the settlement's population has been decreasing. Many young people have left their village to find better career and social opportunities.

=== Community center ===
On March 20, 2010, an initiative committee restored the activity of the village's community center "Byalo more 1929" (Bulgarian: Бяло море 1929).

== Chernichevian diaspora ==
The term Chernichevian diaspora refers to the population who left Chernichevo and their descendants. Chernichevo has a large presence in towns like Krumovgrad, Kardzhali, Haskovo and Plovdiv. Many Chernichevians moved to the state's capital Sofia.

=== Chernichevian communities ===
Chernichevian diaspora maintains a blog about the local history and a Facebook group.
