= Hisar, Bulgaria =

Hisar Хисар
- Village
- Location within Bulgaria
- Coordinates: 41.5400°N 25.6506°E
- Country: Bulgaria
- Province: Kardzhali Province
- Municipality: Krumovgrad
- Elevation: 251 m (823 ft)

Population
  - Total: 18
- Time zone: UTC+2 (EET)
  - Summer (DST): UTC+3 (EEST)

Hisar is a village in Krumovgrad Municipality, Kardzhali Province, southern Bulgaria.
