= Perunika, Bulgaria =

Perunika Перуника
- Village
- Location within Bulgaria
- Coordinates: 41.4500°N 25.7500°E
- Country: Bulgaria
- Province: Kardzhali Province
- Municipality: Krumovgrad
- Elevation: 411 m (1,348 ft)

Population (2020)
  - Total: 36
- Time zone: UTC+2 (EET)
  - Summer (DST): UTC+3 (EEST)

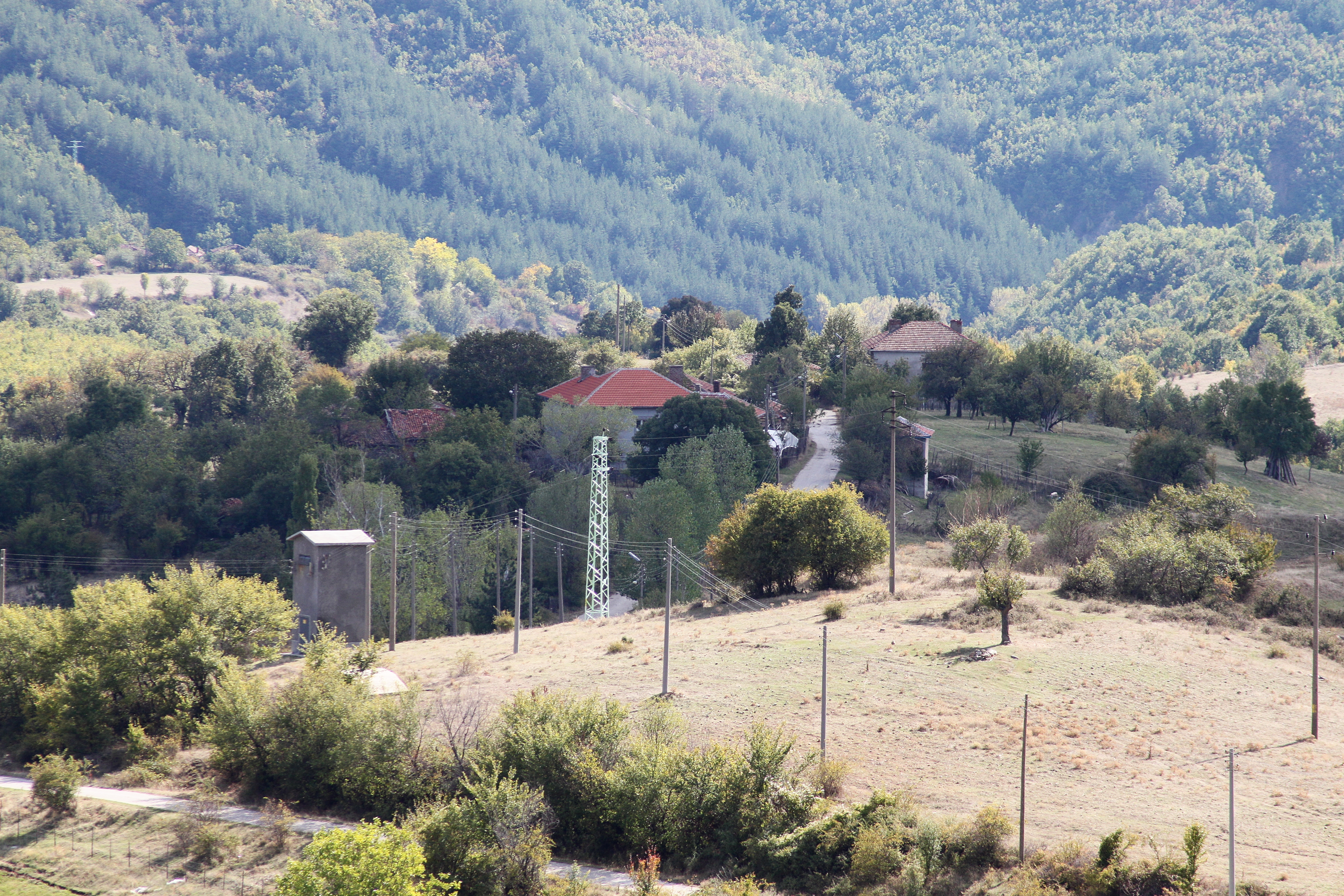
Perunika

Perunika is a village in Krumovgrad Municipality, Kardzhali Province, southern Bulgaria.
