= Vransko, Bulgaria =

Coordinates: 41.4667°N 25.6667°E

Vransko Вранско
- Village
- Interactive map of Vransko
- Country: Bulgaria
- Province: Kardzhali Province
- Municipality: Krumovgrad
- Time zone: UTC+2 (EET)
  - Summer (DST): UTC+3 (EEST)

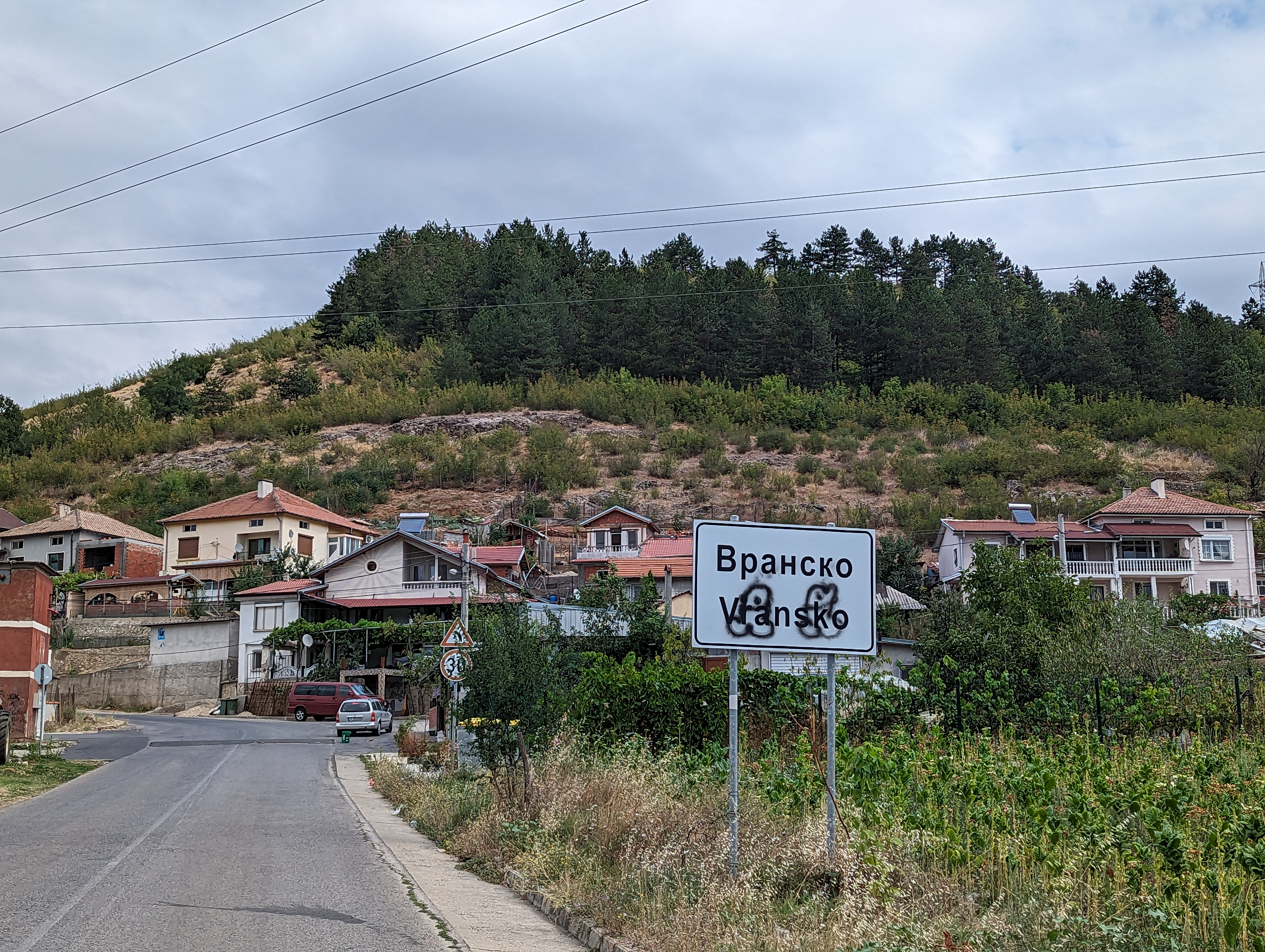

Vransko is a village in Krumovgrad Municipality, Kardzhali Province, southern Bulgaria.
