= Krumovitsa =

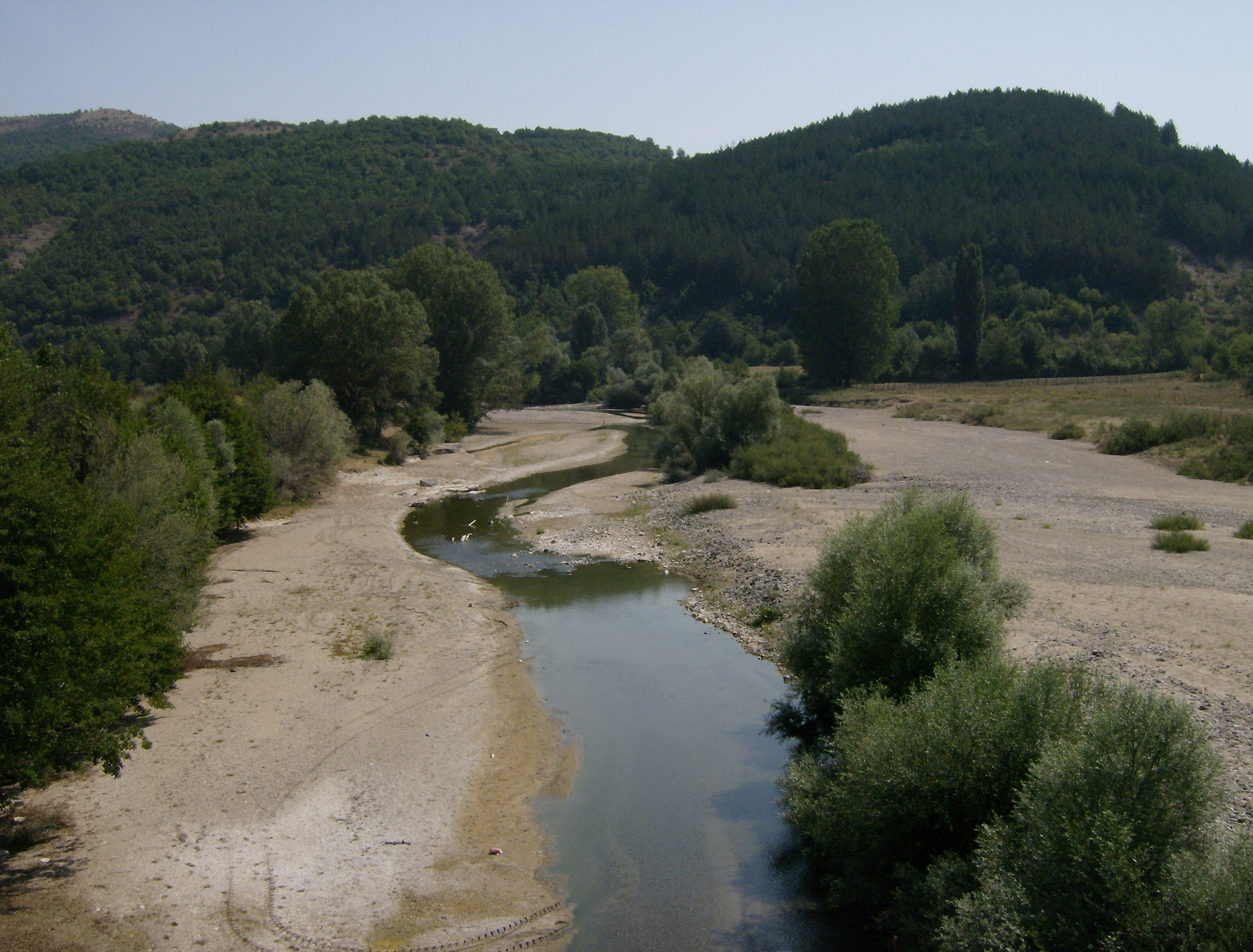
- A view of the Krumovitsa

Location
- Country: Bulgaria

Physical characteristics
- Source
  - location: Maglenik Ridge, Rhodope Mountains
  - elevation: 930 m (3,050 ft)
- Mouth
  - location: Arda River
  - coordinates: 41.6150°N 25.7038°E
  - elevation: 151 m (495 ft)
- Length: 58 km (36 mi)
- Basin size: 671 km^{2} (259 sq mi)

Basin features
- Progression: Arda→ Maritsa→ Aegean Sea

The Krumovitsa (Bulgarian: Крумовица) is a river in the eastern Rhodope Mountains of Bulgaria. The river valley is formed by the Krumovitsa River and the Djushun River together with the surrounding low mountain slopes.

== Geography and geology ==
The rivers flow through deep canyons and open valleys, with the vegetation along the riverbanks dominated by Alnus, Salix, Populus, Rubus, Rosa and Tamarix. Dry grassland, scrub and broadleaved forests cover the neighbouring hills. The forests are dominated by Quercus, Carpinus and Mediterranean tree species. Juniperus is predominant in the sclerophyllous scrub. Land-uses are extensive rearing of sheep and cattle, hunting and forestry, but the area is becoming progressively depopulated due to local emigration.

The area includes the valleys in the middle course of the Krumovitsa River and its tributary Djushun Dere with the adjacent hills and slopes of the Eastern Rhodopes. It covers the sections of the Krumovitsa between the village of Gorna Kula and the mouth of the Djushun Dere, from where it reaches the grounds of the village of Chal to the east. The Krumovitsa river valley in this region is between 300 and 1000 m wide, at places occupied entirely by the sandy riverbed itself. There are differently expressed belts of riverine tree vegetation mainly of poplars (Populus spp.), willows (Salix spp.), black alder (Alnus glutinosa), etc. It is mixed with shrub vegetation of blackberry (Rubus spp.), dog rose, etc. At many places shrubs, mainly of Tamarix spp., and grasses grow in the riverbed itself.

The Krumovitsa banks are often steep, covered with low rocks. Its valley is occupied by farmland patches. The Djushun Dere river valley is mostly narrow and cuts deeply in volcanic rocks with very steep cliffs along the riverbed, waterfalls and small caves. The vegetation along its banks is scarce and dominated by shrub species. Both rivers have a strongly fluctuating water level – very high in February–March and almost none in July–August (except in isolated pools). Most of the area includes low-mountain ridges and slopes. Its bigger part is treeless but the most south-eastern regions are covered by old broadleaved forest of Quercus frainetto, Quercus dalechampii, at places mixed with Carpinus orientalis. Secondary forests have replaced the old ones that have been cut in the recent decades. Typical for the slopes and ridges of the two valleys are the numerous rocks, rock complexes and crests, along with the extensive areas covered by shrub formations of Mediterranean type, dominated by Juniperus oxycedrus, etc. There are many stony sections, overgrown with grass vegetation.

== Birds ==
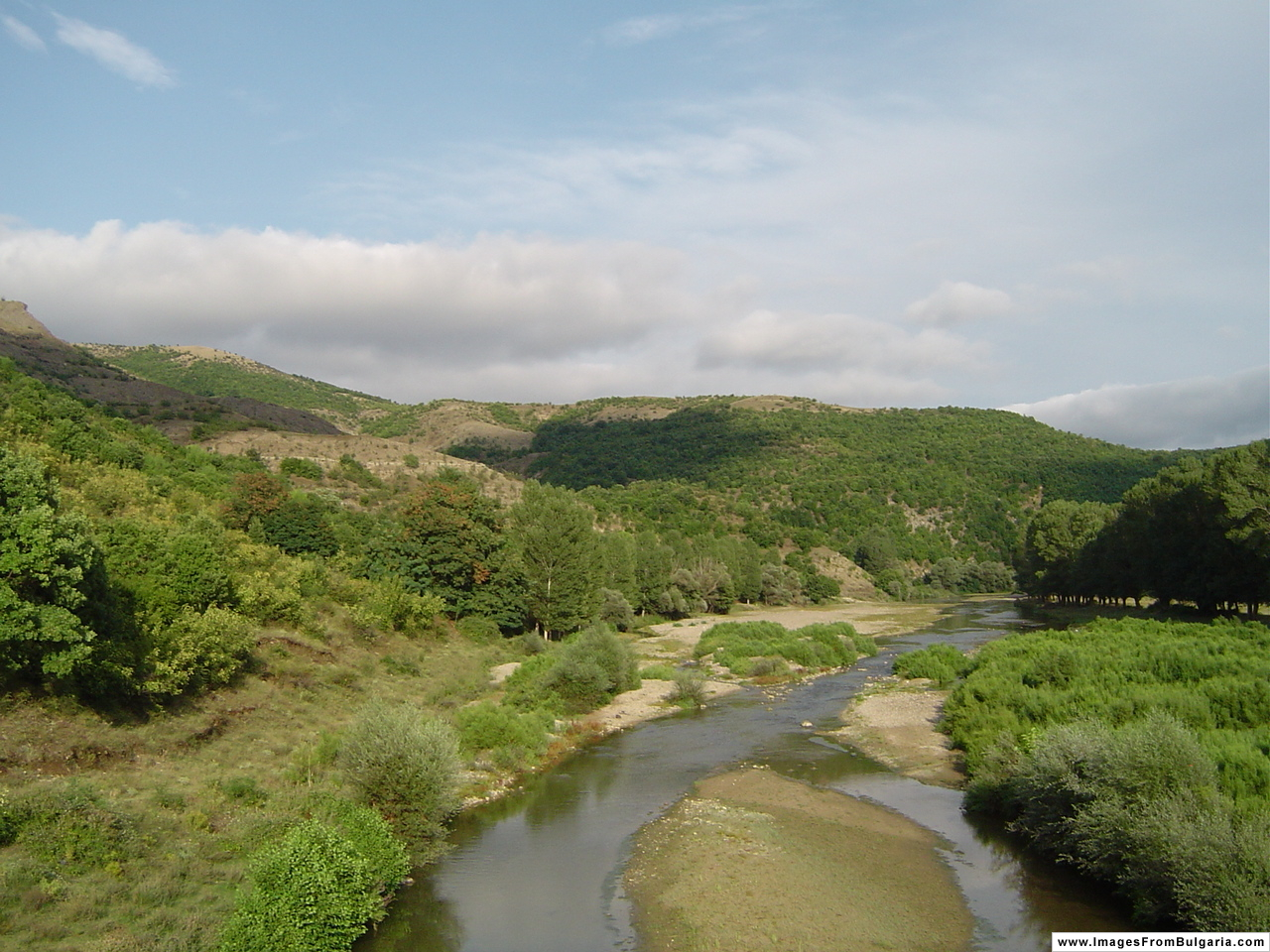
Krumovitsa river

Krumovitsa River Valley is one of the most important areas in Bulgaria for breeding black storks (Ciconia nigra) and Egyptian vultures (Neophron percnopterus). Other nationally significant populations breeding at site are the short-toed snake eagle (Circaetus gallicus) (1 pair), Eurasian eagle-owl (Bubo bubo) (1–2 pairs) and the olive-tree warbler (Hippolais olivetorum) (2–5 pairs).

Krumovitsa Important Bird Area supports 136 bird species. Sixty-four are species of European conservation concern (SPEC), two of them being included in category SPEC 1 as globally threatened, 18 in SPEC 2, and 44 in SPEC 3 as species threatened in Europe. The area is of global importance, as it is a representative biome for the Mediterranean zone. Seven biome-restricted species, typical for the Mediterranean zone out of nine established in Bulgaria, occur there: eastern black-eared wheatear (Oenanthe melanoleuca), olive-tree warbler (Hippolais olivetorum), eastern subalpine warbler (Sylvia cantillans), Sardinian warbler (Sylvia melanocephala), rock nuthatch (Sitta neumayer), masked shrike (Lanius nubicus) and black-headed bunting (Emberiza melanocephala). Krumovitsa is one of the few places in Bulgaria where the cinereous vulture (Aegypius monachus) and lesser kestrel (Falco naumanni) still can be observed. Krumovitsa provides suitable habitats for 46 species, included in Annex 2 of the Biodiversity Act, which need special conservation measures. Thirty-eight of them are listed also in Annex I of the Birds Directive and more than half of them breed in the region in significant populations. The region of the Krumovitsa is one of the most important sites in the country on a European Union scale for the breeding black stork (Ciconia nigra), Egyptian vulture (Neophron percnopterus), booted eagle (Hieraaetus pennatus) and olive-tree warbler.

== Conservation issues ==
The rural depopulation has led to decreases in available food resources (livestock carrion) for vultures in the region. Uncontrolled hunting and fishing are further threats.

=== Threats ===
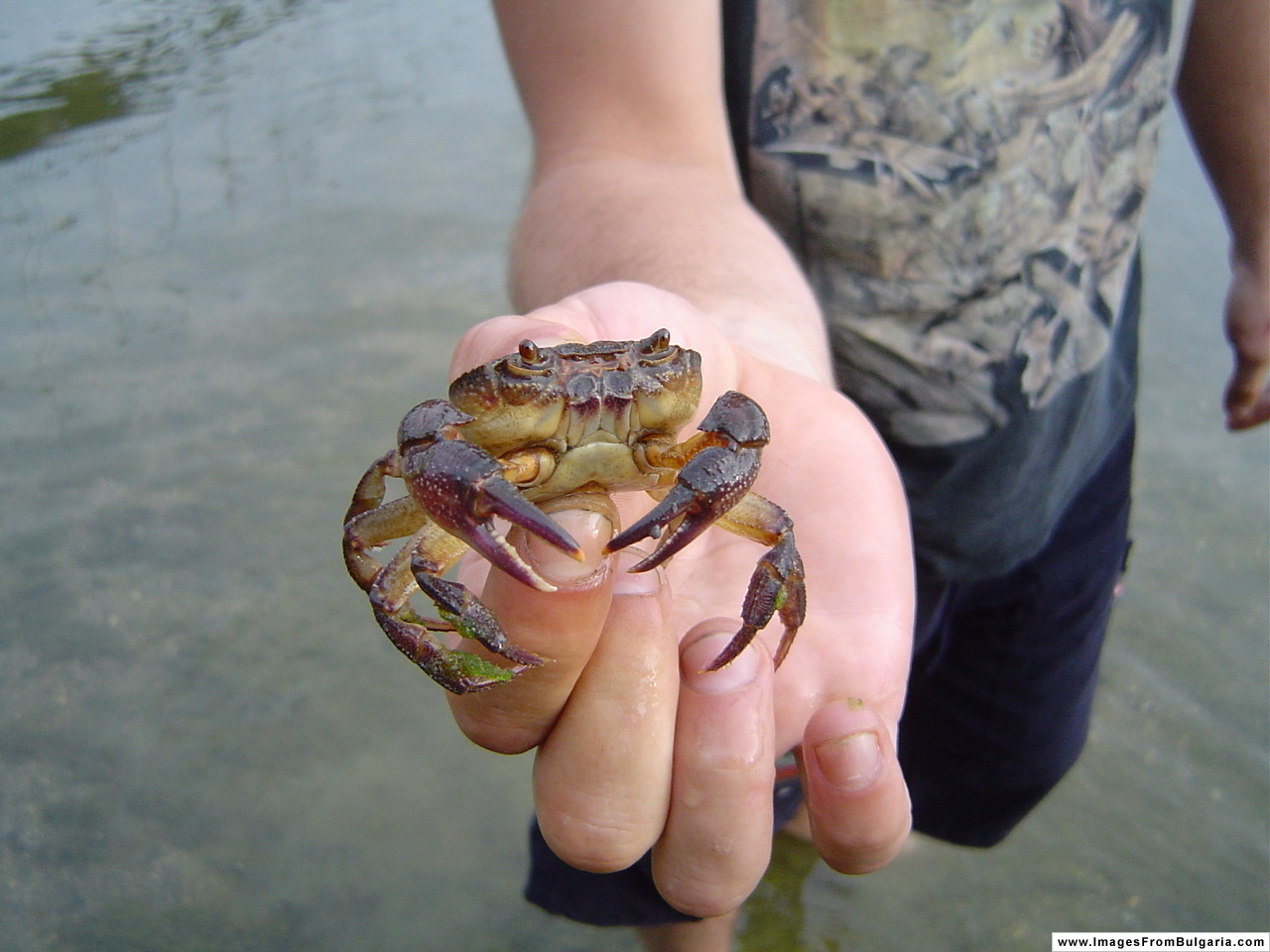
A crab from the river

Three major threats to the area are recognized:

1. Abandonment/reduction of land management (high importance)
2. Intensified forest management (medium importance)
3. Unsustainable exploitation (medium importance)

Krumovitsa is an area sensitive to the human activities related mainly to traditional livestock in the region. Emigration of people, resulting in a decrease in domestic animals and in dead animals in nature, significantly limits the possibilities for vultures to find food. Poaching and use of poison against wolves directly affect raptors, and especially vultures. Existing electrical power lines are dangerous for raptors, especially for young birds. Direct threats to birds are caused also by rock climbing, gliding, and hang-gliding, taking chicks and eggs from the nests. Forest habitats are threatened by burning and natural fires, afforestation with non-indigenous species, as well as illegal cutting of trees especially along the rivers. Reduction in grazing and conversion of pastures to arable lands cause loss of grassland habitats for birds. Investment projects related to the gold mining industry constitute a serious threat, which could cause destruction and fragmentation of habitats on a large scale, disturbance to breeding birds, as well as river pollution. One of the potential threats both to the habitats and to the birds in the area is the development of wind turbine farms. During recent decades tourism has begun to develop more intensively, which could cause negative impact on birds and habitats if the process is not regulated.

=== Legal protection ===
The territory of Krumovitsa is not protected by national nature conservation legislation. Only two small natural monuments are designated for protection of landscapes. In 1997 the area was designated as Important Bird Area by BirdLife International. About 10% of Krumovitsa overlaps with the Arda Valley Corine Site, which was designated in 1998 because of its European value for habitats, rare and threatened plant and animal species, including birds.
