= Krumovgrad Municipality =

Krumovgrad Municipality Община Крумовград
- Municipality
- Location within Bulgaria
- Coordinates: 41°28′N 25°39′E
- Country: Bulgaria
- Province: Kardzhali
- Municipality: Krumovgrad

Area
  - Total: 836.75 km^{2} (323.07 sq mi)

Population (1-Feb-2011)
  - Total: 17,823
  - Density: 21.300/km^{2} (55.167/sq mi)
- Time zone: UTC+2 (EET)
  - Summer (DST): UTC+3 (EEST)
- Website: www.krumovgrad.bg

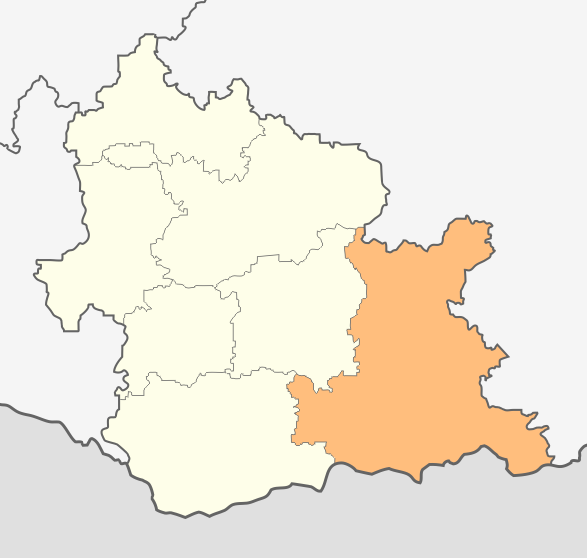
Krumovgrad municipality within Kardzhali Province

Krumovgrad Municipality is a municipality in Kardzhali Province, Bulgaria. The administrative centre is Krumovgrad.

== Demography ==
=== Religion ===
According to the latest Bulgarian census of 2011, the religious composition, among those who answered the optional question on religious identification, was the following:

Religious composition of Krumovgrad Municipality
Orthodox Christianity	12.8%
Catholicism	0.1%
Protestantism	0.1%
Islam	77.7%
No religion	2.4%
Prefer not to answer, others and indefinable	6.9%
