= Pazartsi =

Coordinates: 41.4667°N 25.5333°E

Pazartsi Пазарци
- Village
- Interactive map of Pazartsi
- Country: Bulgaria
- Province: Kardzhali Province
- Municipality: Momchilgrad
- Time zone: UTC+2 (EET)
  - Summer (DST): UTC+3 (EEST)

Pazartsi is a village in Momchilgrad Municipality, Kardzhali Province, southern Bulgaria. Each September, a local fair known as Dag Bayrama takes place at the base of Stramni Rid Mountain. This event is a traditional gathering celebrated by the local community.

== Landmarks ==
=== Asara Fortress ===
Near the neighboring village of Zvezdel, medieval Asara Fortress can be located. Constructed during the 11th and 12th centuries, this fortress was originally built to protect the nearby Zvezdel Mine, which was once used to mine gold and silver. Among the discoveries from the site are unique medallions which are decorated with gold leaf and can be found within the chapel of the fortress.

=== Momchilgard Museum ===
Momchilgard hosts a museum collection which was established in 1969 and is recognized as the first in the Kardzhali Region. Located within the New Life community center, this museum features a diverse array of 1,200 archaeological, ethnographic, and natural exhibits.

=== Orpheus' Sanctuary ===
Orpheus' Sanctuary, can be located roughly 19 km (11.8 miles) north of Pazartsi, near the village of Tatul This site holds archeological significance, and includes both an ancient pagan sanctuary and a medieval fortress.

=== Petrified Forest ===
Nearby, the natural phenomenon known as the Petrified Forest can be found in the settlement of the village of Raven, roughly 25 km (15.5 miles) northeast of Pazartsi. This site has been registered as a protected landmark, and features fossilized trees estimated to be around 30 million years old.

=== Borovets Reserve ===
Additionally, the Borovets Reserve, located near Raven, is one of four reserves in the Eastern Rhodopes. This reserve, important for its preservation of the easternmost natural pine habitat, has been registered as a protected site to maintain its diverse flora and endangered fauna.
