= Konche =

Coordinates: 41.4500°N 25.5333°E

Konche Конче
- Village
- Interactive map of Konche
- Country: Bulgaria
- Province: Kardzhali Province
- Municipality: Momchilgrad
- Time zone: UTC+2 (EET)
  - Summer (DST): UTC+3 (EEST)

Konche is a village in Momchilgrad Municipality, Kardzhali Province, southern Bulgaria. As of 2021, the population stood at 184 residents with 94 males and 90 females.

== Landmarks ==
Approximately 10 km (6.2 miles) north of Konche, the neighboring village of Ribino has been declared a protected area. This site was designated to safeguard endangered species and preserve the karst landscape, which includes rocks, springs, and caves.

To the southeast, about 19 km (11.8 miles) from Ribino, near the village of Limets, stands the sanctuary of Sabaziy, dedicated to the Sun God is a notable historical site in the area.

Not far from Konche, roughly 25 km (15.5 miles) to the north, near the village of Tatul, is the archaeological landmark known as Orpheus' Sanctuary. This site includes an ancient pagan sanctuary and a medieval fortress, recognized as one of the significant architectural discoveries of recent times.

In the vicinity of neighboring village Zvezdel, the medieval Asara Fortress, built during the 9th to 11th centuries, stands as a historical monument. The fortress was used to defend the Zvezdel mine, which was a source of gold and silver. Among the notable artifacts discovered at this site are unique medallions, including a gold leaf-decorated icon found in the chapel. Nearby, about 28 km (17.4 miles) from Zvezdel, is the Petrified Forest close to the village of Raven. This natural phenomenon features petrified trees that are approximately 30 million years old and has been designated as a protected site. Additionally, the Borovets Reserve, situated near Raven, is one of the four reserves in the Eastern Rhodopes. It plays an important role in preserving the region's pine habitats and is recognized for its national importance.
