= Postnik =

Coordinates: 41.5808°N 25.5619°E

Postnik Постник
- Village
- Interactive map of Postnik
- Country: Bulgaria
- Province: Kardzhali Province
- Municipality: Momchilgrad

Population (2021)
  - Total: 162
- Time zone: UTC+2 (EET)
  - Summer (DST): UTC+3 (EEST)

Postnik is a village in Momchilgrad Municipality, Kardzhali Province, southern Bulgaria. The village was recorded as having a population of 162 as of 2021, with 88 males and 74 females.

== Landmarks ==
Rising to an altitude of 879 meters near the village of Postnik, Mt. St. Ilia can be located. In this area, the grave of Ahat Baba can be located. In the nearby village of Nanovitsa, a popular hunting base can be locatedas well as the dam located next to the village.

Roughly 9 kilometers southwest of Postnik lies the village of Tatul, home to the archaeological site known as Orpheus' Sanctuary in the Kaya Basha area, which translates to "Stone Head" in Turkish. This sanctuary, established in the late Bronze Age, was considered a revered site for Thracian king, Orpheus. When Christianity spread through the Rhodope Mountains at the end of the 4th century, the structure was transformed into a private estate for a local ruler. It remained in this state until the 11th to 12th century, when it came under the ownership of the Byzantine Palaiologos family, and it has since become one of the most significant historical and cultural architectural landmarks of today.

Another fascinating site is the Petrified Forest located in the village of Raven, situated within a deep valley locally known as Gabaz Dere. This site is registered as a protected natural landmark and is home to fossilized trees estimated to be around 30 million years old.
