= Nanovitsa =

Coordinates: 41.5500°N 25.5667°E

Nanovitsa Нановица
- Village
- Interactive map of Nanovitsa
- Country: Bulgaria
- Province: Kardzhali Province
- Municipality: Momchilgrad

Population (2021)
  - Total: 456
- Time zone: UTC+2 (EET)
  - Summer (DST): UTC+3 (EEST)

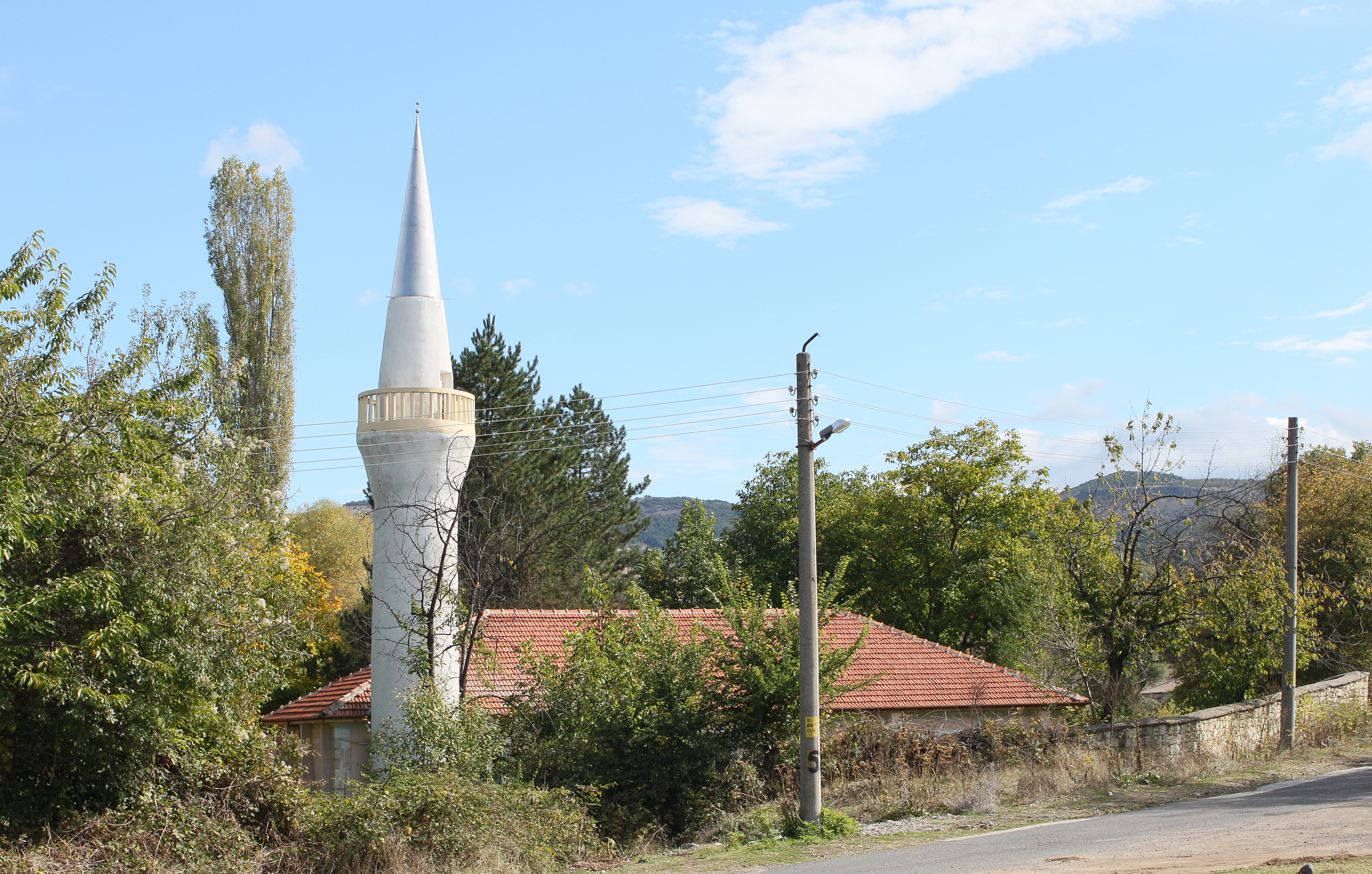
Nanovitsa in 2011

Nanovitsa is a village in Momchilgrad municipality, Kardzhali province, southern Bulgaria.

== Landmarks ==
Near the neighboring village of Tatul, archaeological site known as Orpheus' Sanctuary can be located. This site, located in the Kaya Basha area, dates back to the late Bronze Age and was initially a sanctuary for Thracian king Orpheus. The site's importance continued through the Byzantine era when it was incorporated into the estate of the Palaiologos family.

The neighboring village of Manchevo is notable for The House of Ali Bey, a historical building erected in 1851. This historical landmark showcases the architectural style of the late 18th and 19th centuries.

Nearby, in the village of Nanovitsa, visitors can enjoy a hunting base that attracts outdoor enthusiasts. Additionally, the area features a dam offering fishing opportunities.

Between the villages of Neofit Bozvelievo and Lale, about 3 km (1.9 miles) south of Neofit Bozvelievo and 5 km (3 miles) southwest of Lale, includes 11 rock niches. Among these, two acoustic niches are notable for their unique echo effects experienced by those standing before them.

In neighboring village of Raven, the Petrified Forest is a natural landmark situated within a valley known as Gabaz Dere. Declared a protected site, it features fossilized trees estimated to be around 30 million years old. The forest attracts biologists, naturalists, and eco-tourists.
