= Chobanka =

Chobanka Чобанка
- Village
- Location within Bulgaria
- Coordinates: 41.5833°N 25.4833°E
- Country: Bulgaria
- Province: Kardzhali Province
- Municipality: Momchilgrad
- Elevation: 506 m (1,660 ft)
- Time zone: UTC+2 (EET)
  - Summer (DST): UTC+3 (EEST)

Chobanka is a village in Momchilgrad Municipality, Kardzhali Province, southern Bulgaria. Each September, a large festival for the Alevi people takes place here, being the largest festival in the Rhodopes. In the summer, scientists and nature fans come to see these ancient trees.

== Landmarks ==
In the neighboring village of Bivolyane, there’s an old site called "Emala Baba," built in the 17th century. It has a tomb with six graves under one roof and an eight-sided shape on the ceiling. An inscription says Gunnar Baba, the son of Emala Baba, is buried here. Nearby is the grave of Fatma, the wife of Prophet Ali, who is known as the protector of mothers and children.

Not far from the neighboring village of Raven is the "Petrified Forest" in a valley called "Gabaz Dere." This place hold cultural and historical significance as it is home to fossilized trees that are around 30 million years old.

The "Borovets" reserve, also near Raven, is one of four key reserves in the Eastern Rhodopes. It helps protect the pine forest here. The area has many plants and animals, including pine trees, oak trees, wild pears, apples, and prickly junipers. Some of these are rare and protected in Bulgaria and beyond.

Close to Chobanka, in the village of Tatul, is "Orpheus' Sanctuary," which is 5 km east of Chobanka. This site has an old temple and a medieval castle. It is a significant historical discovery that shows much about ancient cultures and their buildings.
