= Kos (village) =

Coordinates: 41.5167°N 25.5167°E

Kos Кос
- Village
- Interactive map of Kos
- Country: Bulgaria
- Province: Kardzhali Province
- Municipality: Momchilgrad
- Time zone: UTC+2 (EET)
  - Summer (DST): UTC+3 (EEST)

Kos is a village in Momchilgrad Municipality, Kardzhali Province, southern Bulgaria. In 2021 the population was reported as 78 residents, with 40 females and 38 males.

== Landmarks ==
In the neighboring village of Tatul, approximately 12 km (7.5 miles) north of Kos, the archaeological site known as Orpheus' Sanctuary is located in the Kaya Basha area. This sanctuary, which began construction in the late Bronze Age, is believed to have been a revered site dedicated to a deified Thracian king, Orpheus. The complex was significant both before and after the advent of Christianity. When Christianity was adopted in the Rhodope Mountains in the late 4th century, the site was repurposed into a secular estate. It remained in use until the 11th-12th centuries when it came under the ownership of the Palaiologos family.

A notable natural site is the Petrified Forest located in the neighboring village of Raven, within a deep valley locally known as Gabaz Dere. This protected natural landmark, approximately 30 million years old, features fossilized trees and attracts biologists, naturalists, and eco-tourists, particularly during the summer months.

Nearby, between the neighboring villages of Neofit Bozvelievo, situated 2 km (1.2 miles) to the northeast, and Lale, 3 km (1.9 miles) to the south, is a ritual complex consisting of 11 rock niches spread across two levels. Among these niches, two known as the acoustic niches have a unique feature: they produce an echo that returns in a distinct manner to the person standing in front of them.
