= Dzhelepsko =

Djelepsko Джелепско
- Village
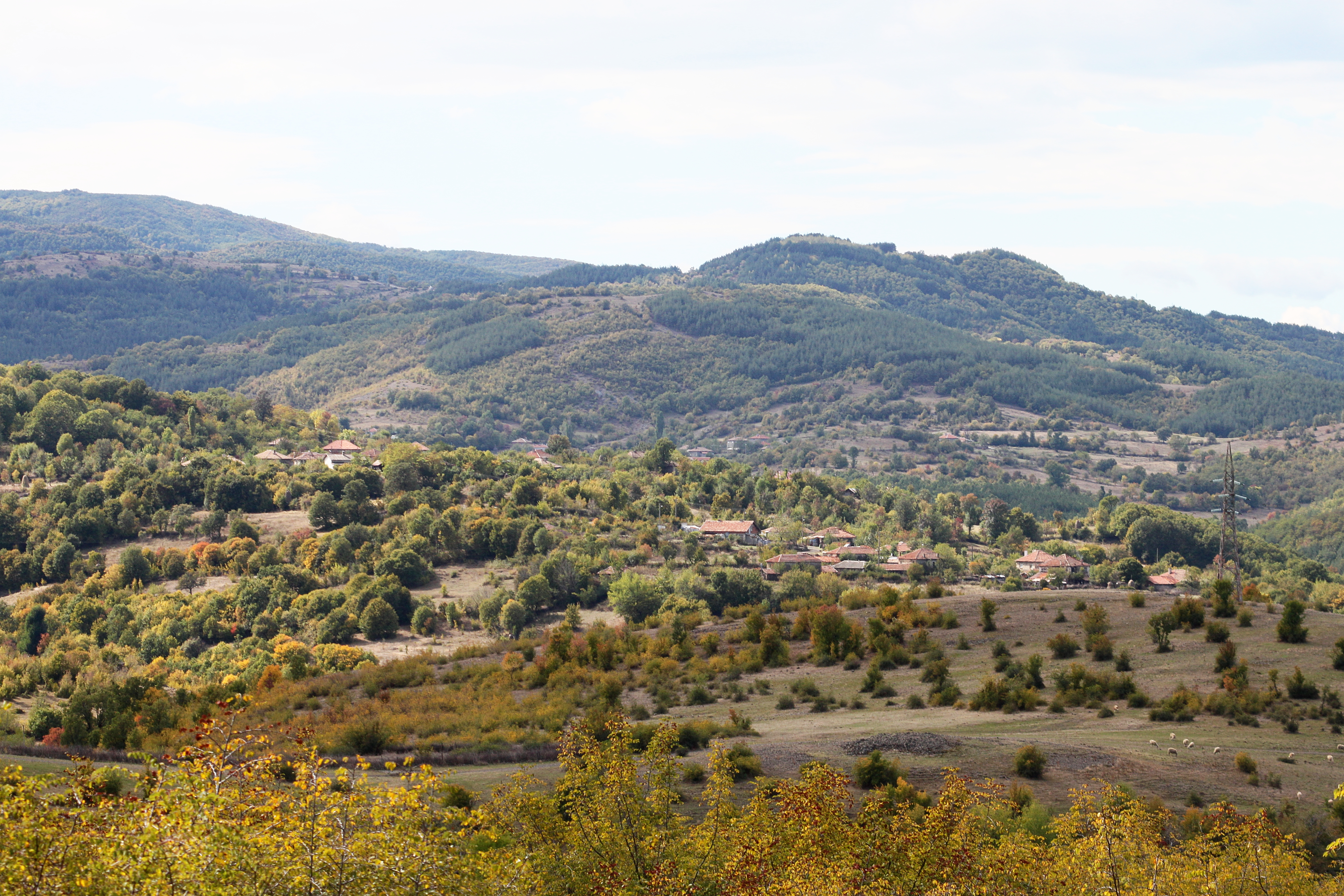
- Dzhelepsko in 2011

- Location within Bulgaria
- Coordinates: 41.5000°N 25.5333°E
- Country: Bulgaria
- Province: Kardzhali Province
- Municipality: Momchilgrad
- Elevation: 497 m (1,631 ft)
- Time zone: UTC+2 (EET)
  - Summer (DST): UTC+3 (EEST)

Djelepsko is a village in Momchilgrad Municipality, Kardzhali Province, southern Bulgaria. As of 2021, the village had a population of 190 people.

== Landmarks ==
The medieval fortress of Asara, built in the 11th and 12th centuries, is situated near the neighboring village of Zvezdel. It once served as a defensive structure for the nearby Zvezdel mine, where gold and silver were extracted. Significant finds at the site include distinctive medallions, which were part of an icon decorated with gold leaf, discovered within the chapel.

Nearby, the area features several notable attractions. The Petrified Forest, located about 17 kilometers northwest of Dzhelepsko in the village of Raven, is a protected site renowned for its fossilized trees, which are estimated to be around 30 million years old. Another nearby site is the Borovets reserve, situated close to Raven. This reserve is one of four in the Eastern Rhodopes and plays a crucial role in preserving the natural habitat of pine.

In neighboring village Momchilgrad, the museum established in 1969 is located within the New Life community center. The museum houses approximately 1,200 exhibits spanned across Archaeology, Ethnography, and Nature; It represents the first museum in the Kardzhali Region.

To the north of Dzhelepsko, near the village of Tatul, lies the Orpheus' Sanctuary, which includes an ancient pagan sanctuary and a medieval fortress. This site is considered a historically significant architectural find.

Each September, the local fair known as Dag Bayrama is held at the base of Stramni Rid Mountain, providing a cultural event for the community.
