= Manchevo =

Manchevo Манчево
- Village
- Interactive map of Manchevo
- Coordinates: 41.5500°N 25.4500°E
- Country: Bulgaria
- Province: Kardzhali Province
- Municipality: Momchilgrad
- Elevation: 647 m (2,123 ft)
- Time zone: UTC+2 (EET)
  - Summer (DST): UTC+3 (EEST)

Manchevo is a village in Momchilgrad Municipality, Kardzhali Province, southern Bulgaria. The last reported population of this village was just 1 person in 2013.

== Landmarks ==
Neighboring village Momchilgrad features a historic mosque that has functioned as a religious temple for approximately 300 years. Distinguished by its two minarets, this mosque is the only one in the area with such a feature and still worshipers to this day.

A museum collection established in 1969 can also be found. This museum is the first of its kind in the Kardzhali Region. Located within the New Life community center, the museum houses 1,200 archaeological, ethnographic, and natural exhibits.

Approximately 7 km (4.3 miles) from neighboring village Manchevo, the Petrified Forest near the village of Raven can be located. This forest is recognized as a protected natural site. This site features fossilized trees that are estimated to be around 30 million years old. It frequently attracts biologists, naturalists, and eco-tourists.

Also in the vicinity of Raven is the Borovets Reserve, one of the four reserves in the Eastern Rhodopes. The reserve aims to protect the natural pine habitat and has a well-documented flora, including pine, oak, wild pear, and prickly juniper. The forest is also home to several species listed in Bulgaria’s Red Book and protected at both European and global levels.

Not far from Manchevo, about 11 km (6.8 miles) away, is the archaeological site of Orpheus' Sanctuary, located near neighboring village Tatul. This site is noted for its significant architectural heritage, where both an ancient pagan sanctuary and a medieval fortress are located.
