= Devintsi =

Devintsi Девинци
- Village
- Location within Bulgaria
- Coordinates: 41.5672°N 25.5667°E
- Country: Bulgaria
- Province: Kardzhali Province
- Municipality: Momchilgrad
- Elevation: 1,051 m (3,448 ft)
- Time zone: UTC+2 (EET)
  - Summer (DST): UTC+3 (EEST)

Devintsi is a village in Momchilgrad Municipality, Kardzhali Province, southern Bulgaria. As of 1021 the population was recorded to be 93 residents.

== Landmarks ==
The Petrified Forest, located in Raven's deep valley known as Gabaz dere, is a natural landmark. This protected site features fossilized trees that are roughly 30 million years old. The forest frequently draws attention from biologists, naturalists, and eco-tourists. Nearby, the neighboring village of Nanovitsa hosts a hunting base, attracting hunting and fishing enthusiasts.

The village of Tatul, about 7 km southwest of Devintsi, is home to the ancient archaeological site known as Orpheus' Sanctuary, located in the Kaya Basha area. This sanctuary, which began in the late Bronze Age, was considered a revered site for the deified Thracian king Orpheus around 3,500 years ago. The complex was renowned in ancient times and continued to be significant even after the adoption of Christianity in the Rhodope Mountains at the end of the 4th century. By the 11th-12th centuries, it became part of the Byzantine-Palaiologos family's estate, evolving into one of today's notable architectural landmarks.
