= II-59 road (Bulgaria) =

Road in Bulgaria

Republic Road I-59
- Републикански път I-59

Route information
- Length: 94.2 km (58.5 mi)

Major junctions
- From: Km 358.9 of I-5, Plovdiv
- To: Bulgaria–Greece border east of Ivaylovgrad

Location
- Country: Bulgaria
- Towns: Plovdiv, Asenovgrad, Chepelare, Smolyan, Rudozem

Highway system
- Highways in Bulgaria

Republican Road II-59 (Bulgarian: Републикански път II-59) is a 2nd class road in Bulgaria, running in general direction north–south through the territory of Kardzhali and Haskovo Provinces. Its length is 94.2 km.

== Route description ==
The road starts at Km 358.9 of the first class I-5 road in the southern neighbourhoods of the town of Momchilgrad and heads east through Stramni Rid ridge of the eastern Rhodope Mountains. It cuts through the ridge at the village of Zvezdel, descends from its eastern slopes through the villages of Karamfil and Dolna Kula, as well as the town of Krumovgrad, and ascends the western slopes of the Irantepe ridge. The road then runs through the villages of Polkovnik Zhelyazovo, Pelin and Perunika, reaches the main ridge of Irantepe and follows it northeast, entering Haskovo Province. North of the village of Popsko the II-59 turns southeast, then east through the ridge of Sarta until the town of Ivaylovgrad, where it descends to the valley of the river Arda. From there the road continues eastwards to the village of Slaveevo and the nearby border with Greece, where it becomes an unclassified road towards Kyprinos: border controls with Greece were abolished on 1 January 2025, when Bulgaria fully joined the Schengen Area.
