= Neofit Bozvelievo =

Coordinates: 41.5333°N 25.5667°E

Neofit Bozvelievo Неофит Бозвелиево
- Village
- Interactive map of Neofit Bozvelievo
- Country: Bulgaria
- Province: Kardzhali Province
- Municipality: Momchilgrad
- Time zone: UTC+2 (EET)
  - Summer (DST): UTC+3 (EEST)

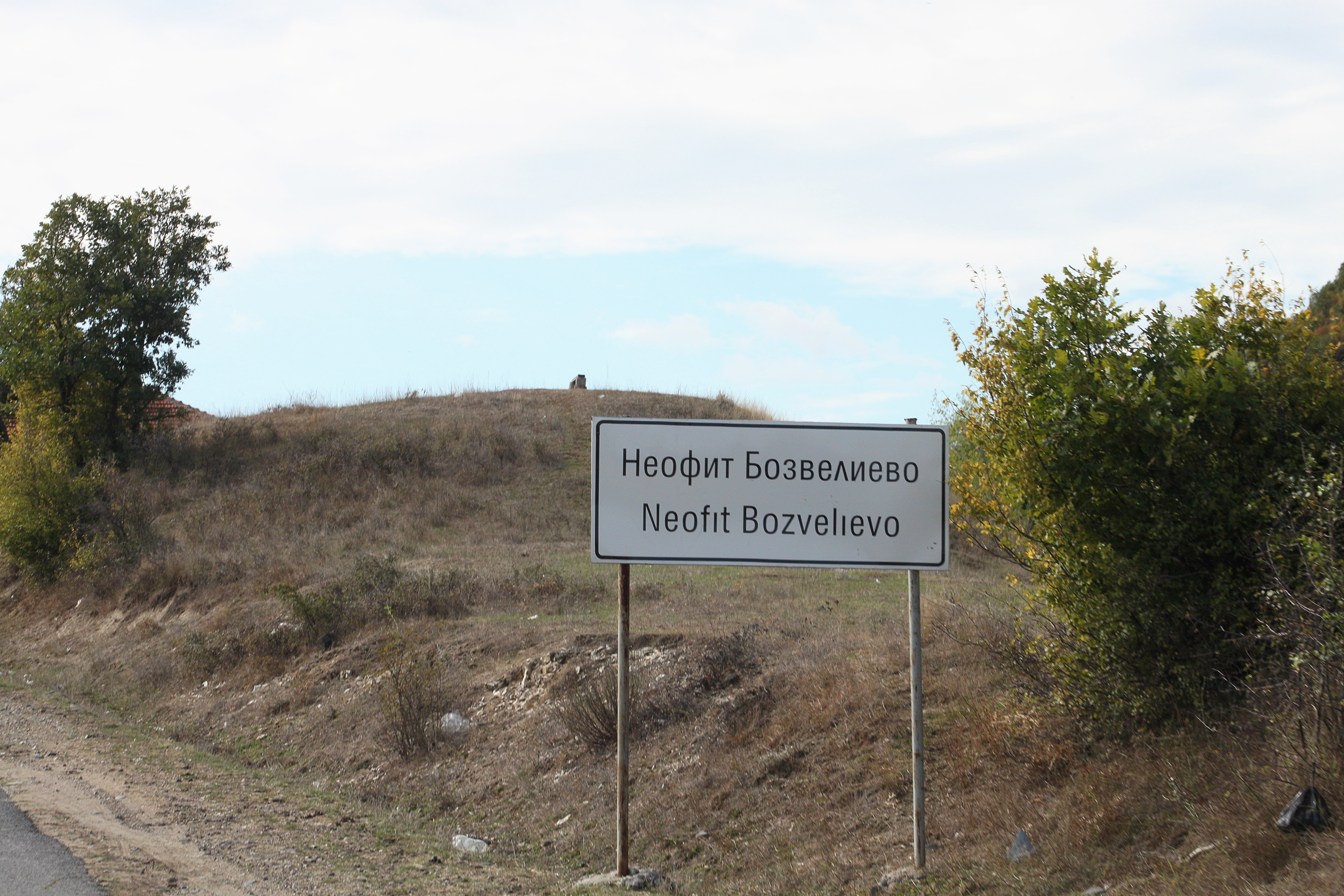

Neofit Bozvelievo is a village in Momchilgrad Municipality, Kardzhali Province, southern Bulgaria.

== Landmarks ==
=== Orpheus' Sanctuary ===
Located approximately 7 km (4.3 miles) northwest of Neofit Bozvelievo, the neighboring village of Tatul is home to the significant archaeological site known as Orpheus' Sanctuary. Situated in the Kaya Basha area, this site dates Iback to the late Bronze Age. The sanctuary was erected for Thracian king, Orpheus. The site transitioned into a secular estate following the adoption of Christianity and remained influential until the 11th-12th centuries, when it became part of the Byzantine Palaiologos family's estate.

=== Rock Niches ===
In the area between the villages of Neofit Bozvelievo and Lale, about 2 km (1.2 miles) southwest of Neofit Bozvelievo and 5 km (3.1 miles) southeast of Lale, there is a ritual complex featuring 11 rock niches. Of particular interest are two acoustic niches, which have a unique property where they create an unusual echo effect when sounds are made in front of them.

=== Petrified Forest ===
Nearby, the neighboring village of Raven is home to the Petrified Forest, located in a deep valley known locally as Gabaz Dere. This site has been listed as a protected natural landmark due to its fossilized trees, which are approximately 30 million years old.

=== Natural Reserve ===
Also located near Raven, the Borovets Reserve can be located, and is one of the four reserves in the Eastern Rhodopes. Established to preserve the easternmost natural pine habitat, the reserve is known for its flora, which includes pine, oak, wild pear, apple, and prickly juniper. The fauna in the reserve includes species listed in Bulgaria's Red Book and is protected at both European and global levels.
