= Bagryanka =

Bagryanka Багрянка
- Village
- Location within Bulgaria
- Coordinates: 41.5090813°N 25.4234464°E
- Country: Bulgaria
- Province: Kardzhali Province
- Municipality: Momchilgrad
- Elevation: 462 m (1,516 ft)
- Time zone: UTC+2 (EET)
  - Summer (DST): UTC+3 (EEST)

Bagryanka is a village in Momchilgrad Municipality, Kardzhali Province, southern Bulgaria.

== Landmarks ==
The Old Mosque, found in neighboring village Momchilgrad, is situated about 3 km (2 miles) from Bagryanka. Built approximately 300 years ago, it remains an active place of worship. It stands out in the region for having two minarets and draws many people for prayer.

The "Petrified Forest" is located in neighboring village Raven, roughly 11 km (7 miles) northeast of Bagryanka. This site features ancient trees that have turned to stone over about 30 million years. It is categorized as a protected landmark and attracts biologists, naturalists, and ecotourists, especially in the summer.

Reserve "Borovets" is another important location, situated around 11 km (7 miles) from the village. It is one of four reserves in the Eastern Rhodopes and plays a significant role in preserving the region’s pine forest habitat. The reserve includes various plant species like pine, oak, wild pear, apple, and prickly juniper. It also hosts several animal species listed in Bulgaria's Red Book and protected internationally.
