= Kos (disambiguation) =

Kos is a Greek island.

Kos may also refer to:

== People ==
- Kos (surname), a Slavic surname, common in Slovenia, Croatia and Poland, includes a list of people with the surname
- Kos, nickname for Markos Moulitsas (born 1971), founder of the Daily Kos blog
- Kos, nickname of UFC welterweight fighter Josh Koscheck (born 1977)

== Places ==
- Kos (regional unit), a regional unit of Greece
- Kos (village), Bulgaria
- Koš, Slovakia, a village and municipality
- Kos Manor, a 16th-century mansion in Jesenice, Slovenia

== Military ==
- Greek minesweeper Kos (M212), ex-British BYMS-class minesweeper HMS BYMS 2191, transferred to Greece and renamed Kos in 1943, sunk in 1944
- Greek landing ship Kos (L116), a tank landing ship, originally USS Whitfield County, sold to Greece in 1977

== Other uses ==
- Kos (unit), an ancient Indian measure of distance, approximately two miles
- Aero A.34 Kos, a Czech touring plane of the 1930s
- PZL-102 Kos, a Polish two-seat touring and training monoplane introduced in 1959
- Kos, a fictional deity from the 2015 video game Bloodborne
- Kosraean language ISO 639-2 and -3 codes

== See also ==
- KOS (disambiguation)
- Kosa (disambiguation)
- Koss (disambiguation)
- Daily Kos, an American political blog
- k-os, stage name of Canadian musician Kevin Brereton (born 1972)
