= Lale, Bulgaria =

Coordinates: 41.5167°N 25.5500°E

Lale Лале
- Village
- Interactive map of Lale
- Country: Bulgaria
- Province: Kardzhali Province
- Municipality: Momchilgrad
- Time zone: UTC+2 (EET)
  - Summer (DST): UTC+3 (EEST)

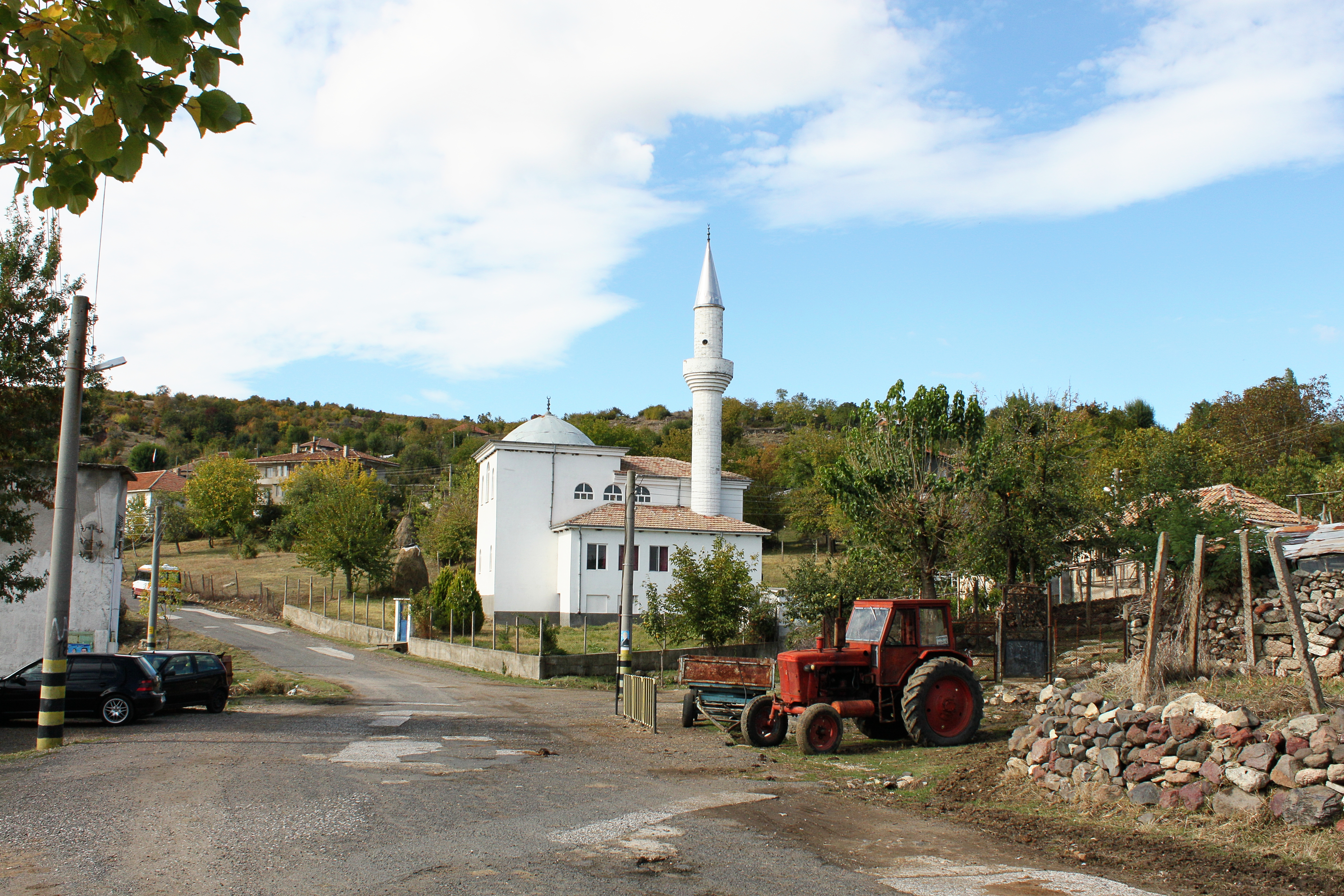

Lale is a village in Momchilgrad Municipality, Kardzhali Province, southern Bulgaria. As of 2021, the village reportedly had a population of 190 residents, 96 of which are male, and 94 of which are female.

== Honours ==
Lale Buttress in Graham Land, Antarctica is named after the village.

== Landmarks ==
The neighboring village of Raven features the Petrified Forest, a culturally and historically significant natural site located in a deep valley known as Gabaz Dere by locals. This area has been declared protected and is home to fossilized trees that are around 30 million years old. The forest draws the attention of biologists, naturalists, and eco-tourists.

Nearby, the Borovets Reserve is situated close to Raven and is one of the four reserves in the Eastern Rhodopes. Its primary purpose of the reserve is to conserve the natural pine forest, an area of national importance. The reserve is known for its diverse flora, including pine, oak, wild pear, and prickly juniper. Additionally, the reserve is home to several species listed in Bulgaria's Red Book and protected on a European and global level.

The archaeological site known as Orpheus' Sanctuary is located about 9 km (5.6 miles) north of Lale, in the Kaya Basha area. Dating back to the late Bronze Age, the sanctuary was originally built as a shrine to Thracian king Orpheus. Recognized both before and after the advent of Christianity, the site was converted into a secular estate after the 4th-century introduction of Christianity in the Rhodope Mountains. By the 11th-12th centuries, it came under the control of the Byzantine Palaiologos family.

Between the neighboring villages of Neofit Bozvelievo, located 2 km (1.2 miles) to the northeast, and Lale, lies a ritual complex with 11 rock niches spread over two levels. Notably, two of these niches, known as acoustic niches, have unique properties that cause sound to echo back in a distinct manner.
