= Pelin =

Pelin may refer to:

== People ==
- Elin Pelin (1877–1949), Bulgarian writer
- Pelin Aroğuz (born 1997), Turkish volleyball player
- Pelin Batu (born 1978), Turkish actress and television personality
- Pelin Çelik (born 1982), Turkish volleyball player
- Pelin Gündeş Bakır (born 1972), Turkish politician and academic
- Pelin Karahan (born 1984), Turkish actress
- Pelin Kivrak (born 1988), Turkish fiction writer
- Rümeysa Pelin Kaya (born 2000), Turkish sport shooter
- Tomislav Pelin (born 1981), Croatian football player
- Tudorel Pelin (born 1969), Romanian football player

== Other uses ==
- Pelin wine, wine mixed with wormwood
- Pelin (village), a village in Bulgaria
- Elin Pelin (town), a town in Bulgaria
