= Zvezdel Mine =

Gold mine in Kardzhali, Bulgaria

Zvezdel mine
- Location within Bulgaria
- Location: Zvezdel, Kardzhali Province, Bulgaria; 41°27′33″N 25°31′3″E
- Products: Gold, silver

Zvezdel Mine was a gold and silver mine in the Rhodope Mountains of southern Bulgaria, protected by the Asara Fortress, which saw construction between the 9th and 11th centuries. The mine is located approximately a 5.1 km drive south from the village of Zvezdel via Route 59 on to Route 5902.

== Archeological findings ==
=== Medallions ===
Excavations and research at the mine site and the surrounding areas have uncovered significant historical gold leaf and bone medallions, some of which are now exhibited at the Regional History Museum in Kardzhali.

=== Bronze censer ===
The bronze censer was uncovered between the Zvezdel Mine and the ruins of the nearby Asara Fortress. This find was part of a broader archeological effort to uncover artifacts related to the fortress's historical use. The bowl is made of bronze and features embossed decorative patterns.The craftsmanship of the bowl demonstrates the high level of metalworking skill present in the region during the medieval period. The bowl is now located in a museum in Sevlievo.
