= Austa =

Austa Ауста
- Village
- Location within Bulgaria
- Coordinates: 41°28′42″N 25°30′05″E
- Country: Bulgaria
- Province: Kardzhali Province
- Municipality: Momchilgrad
- Elevation: 488 m (1,601 ft)
- Time zone: UTC+2 (EET)
  - Summer (DST): UTC+3 (EEST)

Austa is a village in Momchilgrad Municipality, Kardzhali Province, southern Bulgaria. Austa sits at 488m (1,601 ft) elevation.
