= Gurgulitsa =

Gurgulitsa Гургулица
- Village
- Location within Bulgaria
- Coordinates: 41.5833°N 25.5500°E
- Country: Bulgaria
- Province: Kardzhali Province
- Municipality: Momchilgrad

Area
  - Total: 25.765 km^{2} (9.948 sq mi)
- Elevation: 355 m (1,165 ft)
- Time zone: UTC+2 (EET)
  - Summer (DST): UTC+3 (EEST)
- Postal code: 6830

Gurgulitsa is a village located in the Momchilgrad Municipality, Kardzhali Province, southern Bulgaria.
