= Syartsi =

Syartsi Сярци
- Village
- Location within Bulgaria
- Coordinates: 41.5500°N 25.3500°E
- Country: Bulgaria
- Province: Kardzhali Province
- Municipality: Momchilgrad
- Elevation: 348 m (1,142 ft)
- Time zone: UTC+2 (EET)
  - Summer (DST): UTC+3 (EEST)

Syartsi is a village in Momchilgrad Municipality, Kardzhali Province, southern Bulgaria.

== Geography ==
The village of Syartsi is located in southern Bulgaria, within Kardzhali Province, and is administratively part of Momchilgrad Municipality.

The village lies in a mountainous area of the Rhodope Mountains, a rural region characterized by gentle hills and mixed forests.

The elevation of the village is approximately 348 meters above sea level, and it is situated about 190 kilometers southeast of Sofia, and roughly 15 kilometers southwest of the town of Momchilgrad, its nearest administrative center.

It is surrounded by several small villages within the same municipality, such as Baylovo and Siritzi, and lies near the Bulgarian–Greek border, about 25–30 kilometers to the south.
