= Bivolyane =

Bivolyane Биволяне
- Village
- Location within Bulgaria
- Coordinates: 41.5833°N 25.5167°E
- Country: Bulgaria
- Province: Kardzhali Province
- Municipality: Momchilgrad
- Elevation: 545.7 m (1,790 ft)
- Time zone: UTC+2 (EET)
  - Summer (DST): UTC+3 (EEST)

Bivolyane is a village in Momchilgrad Municipality, Kardzhali Province, southern Bulgaria. Each September, the area hosts a major Alevi festival.

== Landmarks ==
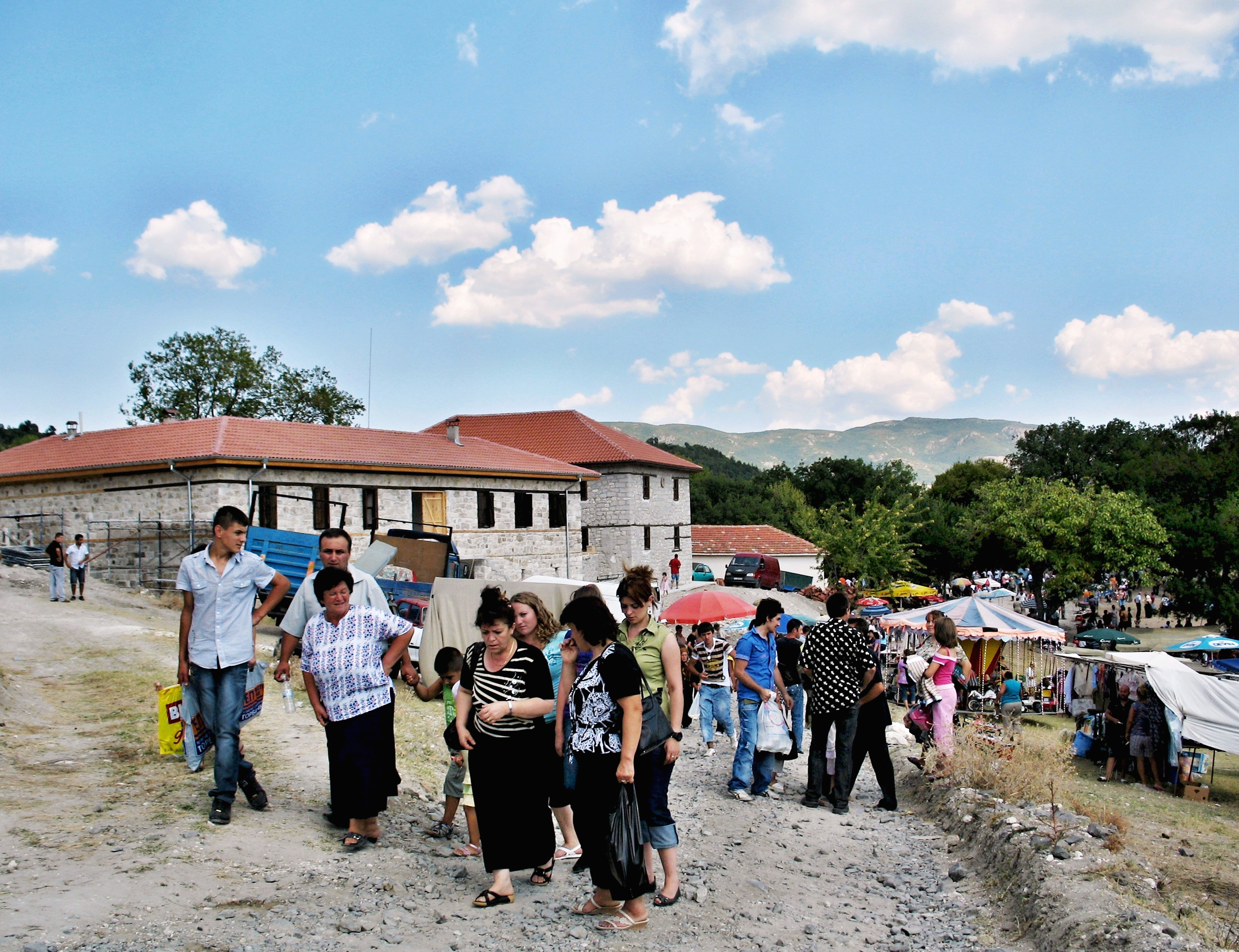
Pilgrimage in the cult site of Bulgarian Alevis Elmeli Baba Tekke in Bivolyane

The Studen Kladenets Dam, which is situated along the Arda River, is a significant location in the region. It ranks as the second dam on the river after the Kardzhali Dam. The lake behind the dam is popular for fishing and various water sports, such as canoeing and pedal boating.

The area known as Tatul, located approximately 13 km from Bivolyane, features both a pagan shrine and a medieval fort. This location is a notable cultural monument, highlighting ancient religious practices and historical structures.

Emala Baba, an ancient site from the 17th century, is located close to the village. The complex includes a tomb with six graves under a single roof and an eight-sided pattern on the ceiling. An inscription at the site mentions Gunnar Baba, the son of Bektashi Father Emala Baba, who is buried there. Nearby is the grave of Fatma, the wife of Prophet Ali’s, who is honored as a protector of mothers and children.
