= Zagorsko =

Zagorsko Загорско
- Village
- Location within Bulgaria
- Coordinates: 41.4833°N 25.3833°E
- Country: Bulgaria
- Province: Kardzhali Province
- Municipality: Momchilgrad
- Elevation: 300 m (980 ft)
- Time zone: UTC+2 (EET)
  - Summer (DST): UTC+3 (EEST)

Zagorsko is a village in Momchilgrad Municipality, Kardzhali Province, southern Bulgaria.
