= Gorsko Dyulevo =

Gorsko Dyulevo Горско Дюлево
- Village
- Location within Bulgaria
- Coordinates: 41.4500°N 25.4167°E
- Country: Bulgaria
- Province: Kardzhali Province
- Municipality: Momchilgrad
- Elevation: 514 m (1,686 ft)
- Time zone: UTC+2 (EET)
  - Summer (DST): UTC+3 (EEST)

Gorsko Dyulevo is a village in Momchilgrad Municipality, Kardzhali Province, southern Bulgaria. The village has a population of 51 as of 2021.
