= Piavets =

Coordinates: 41.4833°N 25.4500°E

Piavets Пиявец
- Village
- Interactive map of Piavets
- Country: Bulgaria
- Province: Kardzhali Province
- Municipality: Momchilgrad
- Time zone: UTC+2 (EET)
  - Summer (DST): UTC+3 (EEST)

Piavets is a village in Momchilgrad Municipality, Kardzhali Province, southern Bulgaria.
