= Slaveevo =

Slaveevo may refer to the following places in Bulgaria:

- Slaveevo, Dobrich Province
- Slaveevo, Haskovo Province
