= Sokolino =

Sokolino Соколино
- Village
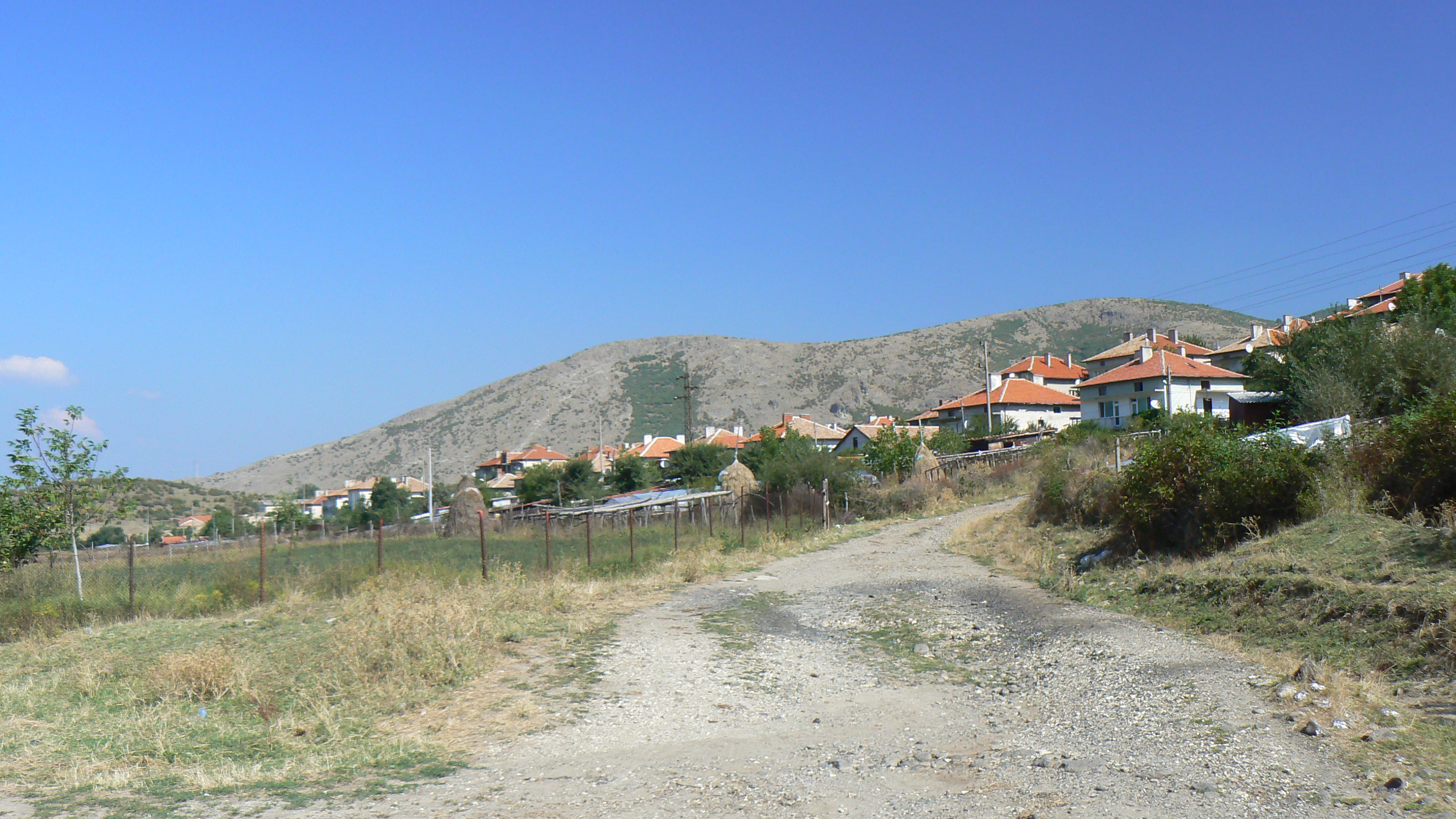
- Village of Sokolino

- Location within Bulgaria
- Coordinates: 41.5167°N 25.4500°E
- Country: Bulgaria
- Province: Kardzhali Province
- Municipality: Momchilgrad
- Elevation: 428 m (1,404 ft)
- Time zone: UTC+2 (EET)
  - Summer (DST): UTC+3 (EEST)

Sokolino is a village in Momchilgrad Municipality, Kardzhali Province, southern Bulgaria.
