= Momina Salza =

Coordinates: 41.5333°N 25.5333°E

Momina salza Момина сълза
- Village
- Interactive map of Momina salza
- Country: Bulgaria
- Province: Kardzhali Province
- Municipality: Momchilgrad
- Time zone: UTC+2 (EET)
  - Summer (DST): UTC+3 (EEST)

Momina salza is a village in Momchilgrad Municipality, Kardzhali Province, southern Bulgaria.
