= Vurhari =

Vurhari Върхари
- Village
- Location within Bulgaria
- Coordinates: 41.5500°N 25.3833°E
- Country: Bulgaria
- Province: Kardzhali Province
- Municipality: Momchilgrad
- Elevation: 300 m (980 ft)
- Time zone: UTC+2 (EET)
  - Summer (DST): UTC+3 (EEST)

Vurhari is a village in Momchilgrad Municipality, Kardzhali Province, southern Bulgaria.
