= Sindeltsi =

Sindeltsi Синделци
- Village
- Location within Bulgaria
- Coordinates: 41.4667°N 25.5833°E
- Country: Bulgaria
- Province: Kardzhali Province
- Municipality: Momchilgrad
- Elevation: 336 m (1,102 ft)
- Time zone: UTC+2 (EET)
  - Summer (DST): UTC+3 (EEST)

Sindeltsi is a village in Momchilgrad Municipality, Kardzhali Province, southern Bulgaria.
