= Koss =

Koss, KOSS, or in German Koß can refer to:

== Places ==
- Koss, Michigan, US
- Koss River, South Sudan

== People with the surname ==
- Christian Koss (born 1998), American baseball player
- Eugenia Koss (1806–1849), Polish ballet dancer
- Gaby Koss (born 1978), German soprano
- Helen L. Koss (1922–2008), American politician
- Ilse Reichel-Koß (1925-1993), German politician
- Irene Koss (1928-1996), German actress
- Jan von Koss (born 1945), Norwegian fencer
- Johann Olav Koss, Norwegian skater
- John Koss (1895–1925), a Norwegian boxer
- Koss, Japanese musician Kuniyuki Takahashi
- Leopold Koss (1920–2012), American physician
- Mary P. Koss, American professor in gender-based violence
- Mathieu Koss (born 1990), French DJ, record producer and composer
- Matthew Koss (born 1961), American physicist
- Milly Koss (Adele Mildred Koss; died 2012), full name Adele Mildred Koss, Us pioneer programmer
- Stephen Koss (1940–1984), American historian

== Other uses ==
- Koss (album), by Paul Kossoff
- Koss City, 2002 album by Lord Kossity
- Koss (Star Trek), a character in Star Trek: Enterprise
- Koss Corporation, a US headphone company
- KOSS, a radio station, Lancaster, California, US
- Kos (unit) or koss, an ancient Indian measure of distance, approximately two miles

== See also ==
- Kos (disambiguation)
- Peter Coss, historian
