= KOS =

KOS may refer to:

- Knowledge of Self, a precept of the Five-Percent Nation
- Knowledge Organization Systems
- KOS Media, Kent, England
- KOS (Yugoslavia), counterintelligence service
- KOS (Serbia)
- Kingdom of Sweden
- Kosovo (UNDP code: KOS), a partially recognized state in Southeastern Europe
- Sihanouk International Airport, Cambodia (IATA code: KOS)

== See also ==
- Kos (disambiguation)
- k-os
