= Koç School =

- Koç Okulu
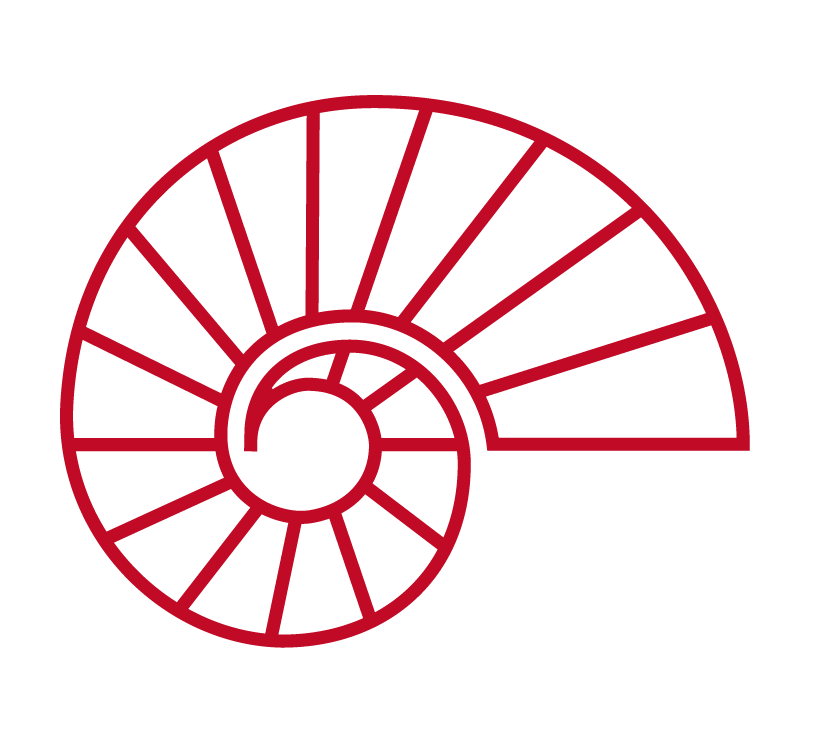
- Istanbul; Turkey

Information
- Type: Private, Boarding, Bilingual
- Motto: Reason, Conscience & Courage
- Established: 1988; 38 years ago
- Founder: Vehbi Koç
- CEEB code: 696175
- Chairperson: İpek Kıraç
- Headmaster: Güray Erkol
- Enrollment: 2227; 192 (Boarding)
- Campus: Suburban (151 acres / 61 ha)
- Color
- Team name: Rams
- Accreditations: IB; ECIS; NACAC
- Newspaper: TAWA
- Affiliation: Vehbi Koç Foundation
- Website: www.koc.k12.tr

The Koç School (Turkish: Koç Okulu) is a private coeducational school in İstanbul, Turkey, founded by Vehbi Koç, one of Turkey's wealthiest businessmen. The school comprises a high school that pioneered the IB program in Turkey and an elementary school. Prospective students gain admission into the high school based on their achievements on the nationwide examination for high schools in Turkey.

== General information ==
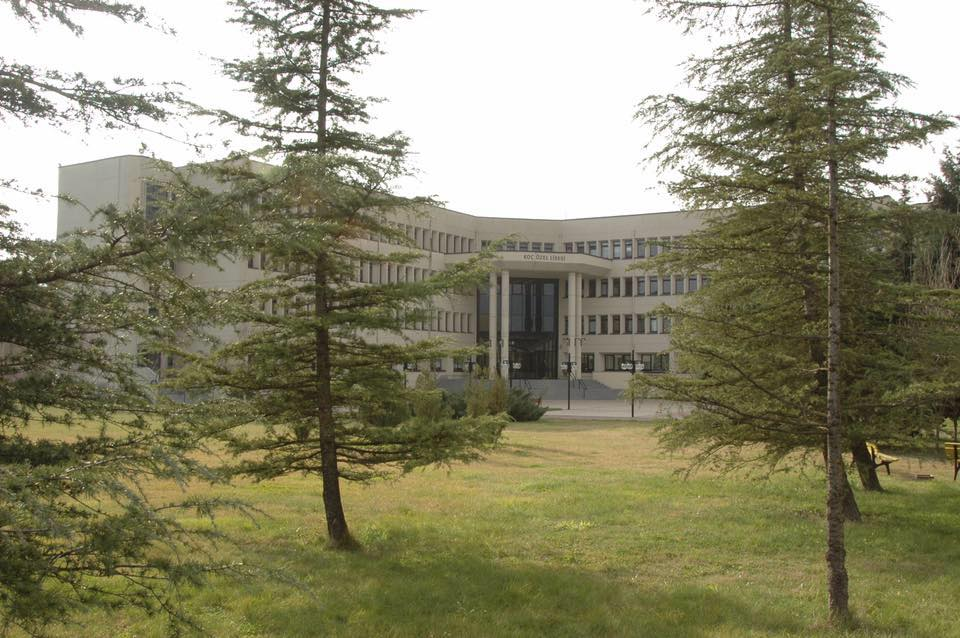
Main Entrance of the High School

Koç School is a high and elementary school fully accredited by the Turkish Ministry of Education, European Council of International Schools (ECIS), International Baccalaureate Organisation (IBO), Independent schools UK, England, Scotland, Wales & NI and international schools worldwide (ISBI) and the National Association for College Admission Counseling (NACAC). It offers boarding for five or seven days a week for students of classes between high school prep to 12th grade at its dorms on its campus.

=== History ===
Founded in 1988 by the Vehbi Koc Foundation, Koc School offers preparation for competitive university exams.

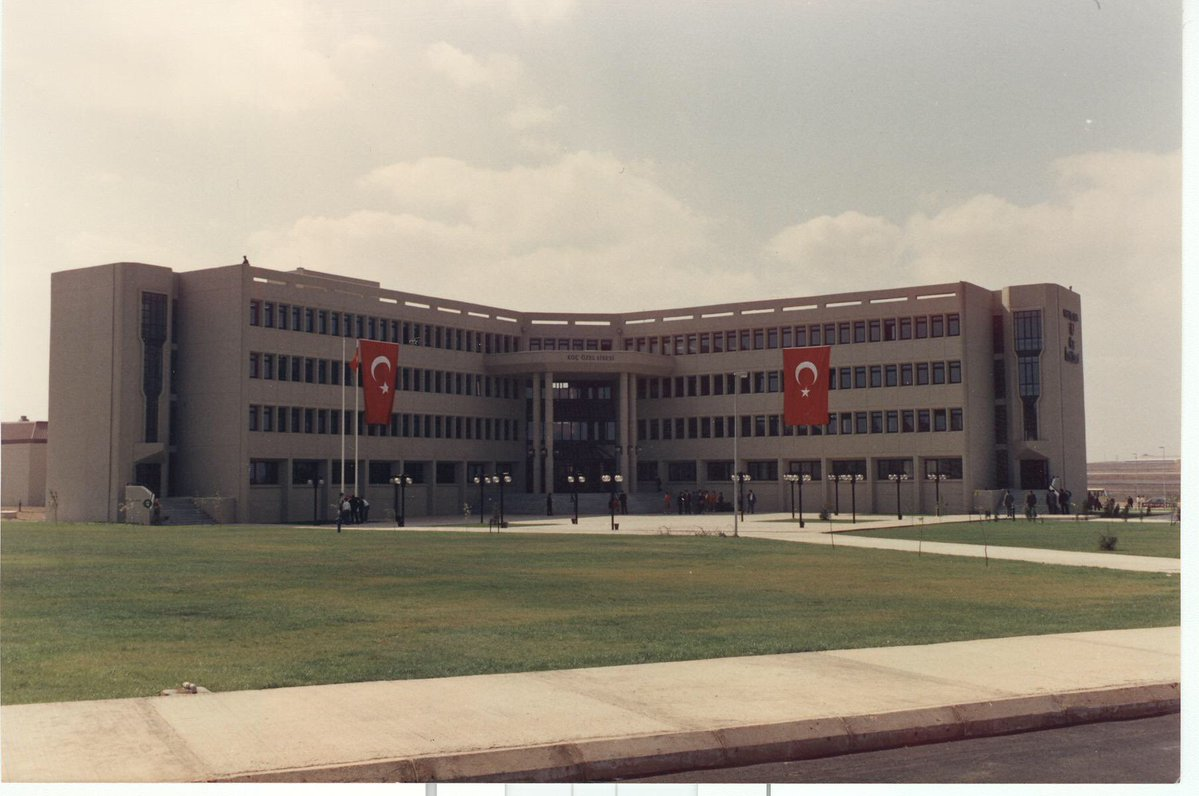
Post Construction, 1988

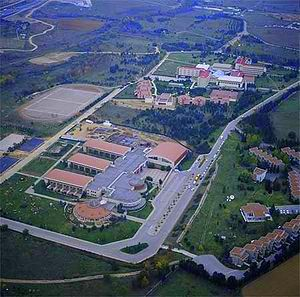
Bird's-eye view of Koç School

Koç School started offering the IB Diploma Programme in 1994. With the introduction of the programme, many students began to apply to overseas educational institutes with high reputation. Koç students have been accepted into universities such as Princeton, Harvard, Oxford, Cambridge, Cornell, Yale, Columbia, Georgetown, University of Pennsylvania, Stanford, Dartmouth, MIT, the London School of Economics, and University of Chicago. With a guidance office committed to assisting students in gaining admission to colleges abroad, the number of Koç students seeking overseas education has constantly increased.

The school's Turkish university entrance success is also considerable: general student achievement is among the top when compared with other similar high schools. In fact in 2000, the top scorer of the national university entrance examination was a Koç School alumna. In the 2006 national examination, 19 Koç students were in the top 1000 of over 1.500.000 attendants and many students that applied abroad were accepted to top ten universities in the US.

General Directors

- John Chalfant (1988–1992)
- Gerald Shields (1992–1996)
- John Chandler (1996–2005)
- Tony Paulus (2005–2008)
- Robert Lennox (2008–2013)
- Koray Özsaraç (2013–2018)
- Murat Günel (2018–2025)
- Güray Erkol (2025-)

High School Directors

- Atakan Demirseren (1988–1998)
- Fehmi Özbay (1998–1999)
- Lalegül Hanım (1999–2000)
- Füsun Ersoy (2000–2006)
- İlkin Özyurt (2006–2008)
- Koray Özsaraç (2008–2013)
- Selen Aydınoğlu (2013–2019)
- Elif Kara Özturk (2019–)

Primary School Directors

- Mesrure Tekay (1998–2013)
- Handan Sungur (2013–2019)
- Demet Gören Niron (2019–)

Middle School Directors

- Tümay Dovan (2013–2019)
- Meltem Önal Sertkaya (2019–)

== Campus and facilities ==
Koç School is located on a 151-acre (0.61 km^{2}) campus on the eastern outskirts of Istanbul, near Tuzla, Istanbul. Many of the school facilities were subject to renovations after the first ten years of the school due to increased demands and population of the school.

The important facilities and buildings on the school campus are:

- High School building: It was opened for the 2022–2023 school year after renovation between 2021 and 2022.
- Suna Kıraç Library: It was moved to a separate and larger building adjacent to high school building in 2002. It was demolished in order to make space for the renovations that took place between 2021 and 2022. It opened to students at its new location in 2023.
- Piramit & (Sevgi Gönül Student Center): It is a student center and lounge. It was constructed in 2002 and replaced the courtyard.
- Atakan Demirseren Hall: It is an auditorium with nearly 900 people capacity (renovated in 2008 and opened with the annual Talent Show),
- Open track and field area
- Tennis Courts
- Sports Center
- Pools
- Football Pitch
- Science Building: It was built in 2013. Entry floor is reserved for physics, first floor for biology, second floor for chemistry while the basement is used for computer science.
- Dorms used to be located in the main school building. They were built as separate buildings due to increased population of the school in 2005.
- Faculty Housing for the teachers and staff.
- Fitness Center
- Art Studios including ceramics, photography, printmaking.
- Elementary school building: Classes, teacher offices, library, auditorium, sports center and cafeteria.
- Kindergarten: It is made up of 4 classes and attached to the Elementary school building.

== High school ==
=== Academics ===
Koç School is a bilingual school in Turkish and English but also offers the option of a second language: French, German or Spanish. Students choose between an IB track or a non-IB track at the end of tenth grade. Koç School is also the IB coordinator in Istanbul, and prepared the IB Turkish Social Studies Curriculum to be covered in all around the world in IB Schools.

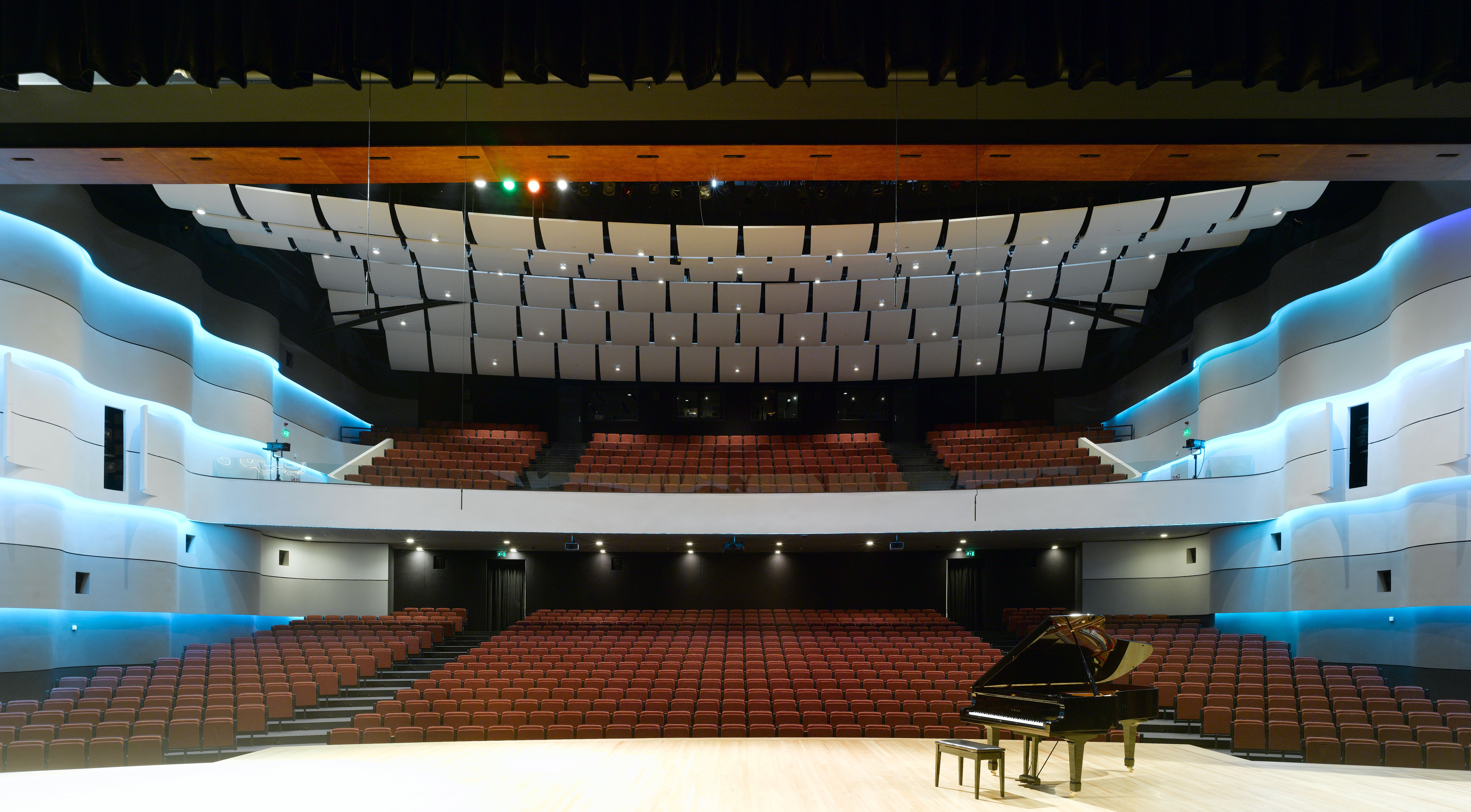
Atakan Demirseren Hall

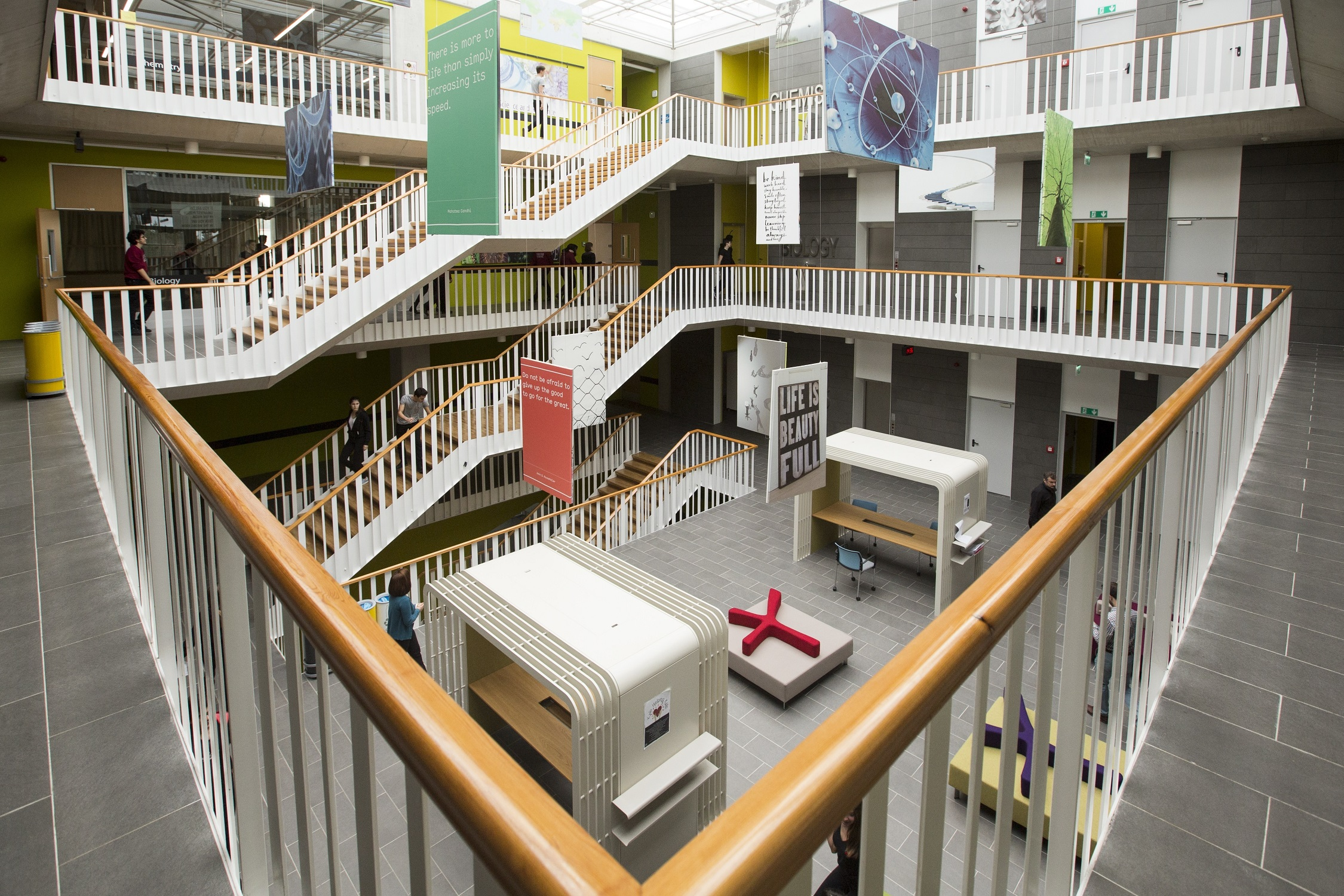
Science Building

Each year, many Koç students prefer to continue their education at overseas universities. The school's Overseas College Guidance Office is strong with its admission statistics. At the end of the academic year, each department gives awards to a select number of students with high academic standing after taking into account the feedback submitted by teachers.

Koç School is also successful in national and international high school competitions in mathematics and sciences.

The school also provides an international faculty with teachers from Australia, Britain, Brazil, Canada, India, Ireland, Russia, Scotland, The Netherlands, U.S., New Zealand and Turkey teaching Science, languages, arts. Some of the current and former notable faculty include John Freely, writer and professor of physics at Boğaziçi University, and Erol Köroğlu, writer and doctor of literature and cultural studies at Sabancı University.

==== Curriculum ====
In the first two years of education, a high school student usually takes the following courses: Turkish Literature, Philosophy, Psychology, English, Physics, Chemistry, Biology, Arts, Military Science, Physical Education, Religion and Ethics, History, Health, Geography, Geometry, Mathematics, an elective second language course, an elective from a variety of courses like Movie Studies, Advanced Multimedia, etc.

In the last two years, Koç School provides a variety of IB and non-IB courses. Among the mandatory and elective courses provided to junior and seniors are: Art History, Biology, Business & Management, Ceramics, Chemistry, Computer Science, Computer Programming, Economics, English, Environmental Systems, French, German, Information Technology in Global Society, Knowledge of Language and Literature, Linguistics, Mathematics, Music, Philosophy, Photography, Physics, Psychology, Theory of Knowledge, Turkish Social Studies, Turkish Literature, and Visual Arts.

There are usually two examinations (or projects and/or papers to be counted as an exam grade) for each course at each semester. Exams are usually held in Common Exam Week (or for the finals Final Examination Week). Examinations are scheduled by the Dean's office and regular class schedule continues to take place with shorter amount of time for each period. After the exam results are announced several awards (with different categories: Academic Success, Effort, Improvement) are given by the teachers to students.

=== Extracurriculars and traditional activities ===
==== Extracurricular activities ====
It is compulsory in both elementary and high school for each student to join a student club or a sports activity offered at school. Every student has to pick one of the following activities at the beginning of each semester and has to regularly attend its meetings.

The school has over 50 clubs. Some of the available extracurricular activities and clubs are:

- SEMEP (South East Mediterranean Environmental Project)
- Model United Nations Club
- Invisible Children
- European Youth Parliament Club
- Debate Club
- Ceramics Club
- Chess Club
- Jewellery Design Club
- Librarianship Club
- Social Assistance and Solidarity Club
- Amnesty International Club
- Literature
- ISTA (International Schools Theatre Association)
- World Scholar's Cup
- Voluntary social work projects
- Wikipedia Club
- History Club
- Philosophy Club
- Atatürk's Thinking and Principles Club
- Athleticism Club
- American Football Club
- Football Club
- Baseball
- Softball
- German Language
- The Global Friendship Project
- Chorus
- Tennis Club
- Volleyball Club
- Atatürk Club
- Badminton
- Basketball Club
- Table Tennis Club
- Science Club
- Model Aircraft Making Club
- Drama Club
- Computing Club
- Rugby Club
- Fantasy Role Playing
- Journal Clubs (Mindscapes, Fanzin and Boyut)
- Lean in Club
- Music Club
- Visual Arts Club
- Folk Dance Club
- Modern Dance Club
- Camping Club
- Cooking
- Environment
- Skiing & Snowboard
- Robotics
- Sustainable Life Club
- Film Club

Koç School is also the first Turkish school to apply the International Award Association programme.

Environmental Projects are of the major activities in the school, in fact recycling project of Koç School Students won the First Prize in the International Volvo Adventure 2006 competition.

11th grade students won the NASA Ames Space Settlement Design Contest in 2018 and 9th grade group won second prize in 2019.

At the end of each academic year, extracurricular awards are given to students according to the feedbacks of the supervisors of clubs.

===== Sports =====
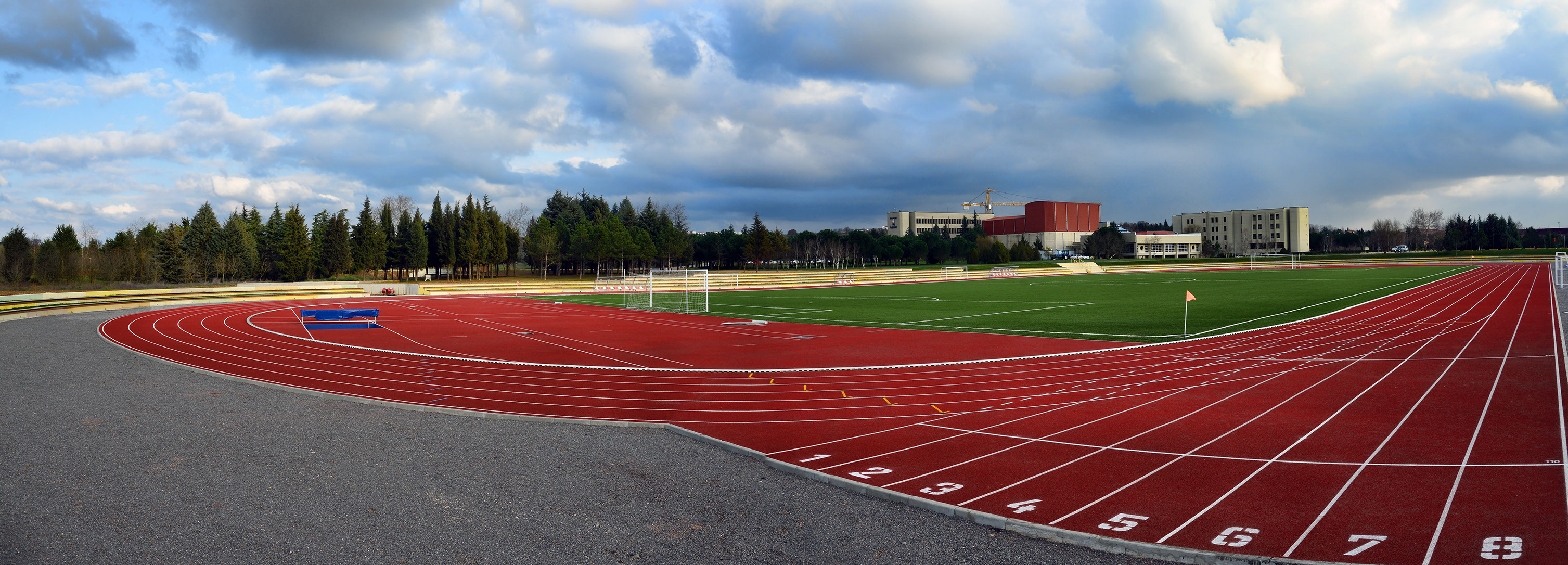
Koç Arena

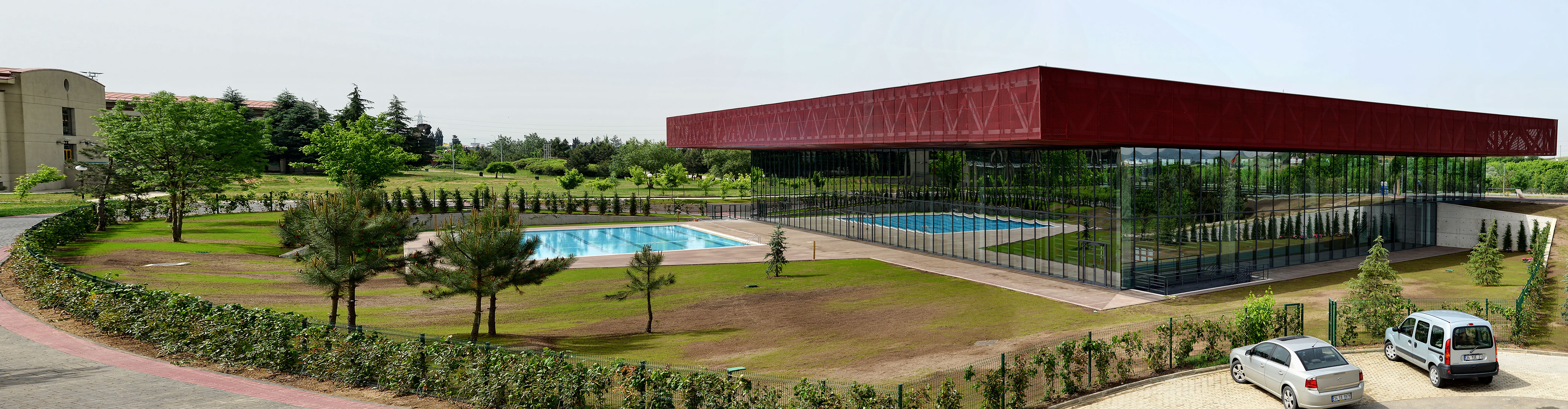
The Pool Complex

The school has many facilities for sports. Some of the school sport teams are girls-boys basketball, girls volleyball, badminton, table tennis, athleticism, football, folk dance, skiing, dance, and rhythmic gymnastics. Team members are determined after eliminations at the beginning of the academic year. School teams regularly participate in national tournaments.

Each year there are basketball and football tournaments between classes in which each class forms its teams. There are about two matches each week in which boys and girls from different classes compete. The final matches are done at SpringFest. The winner class team is awarded with a cup and each team member with a medal.

===== Publications =====
The school has a growing number and an increasing quality of publications, among them are literary magazines like Boyut, Fanzin and Mindscapes, a two-week newspaper T.A.W.A, and Philosophy. All publications are open to submissions from the whole student body. Boyut and Fanzin are published by the member students in each journal's clubs with the assistance of the Turkish department. Mindscapes is published with the assistance of the English language department and it is also open to all contributions after an evaluation process carried by the student and teacher editors. TAWA was initially the publication/newsletter of the Student Council and later gained an independent position as the school newspaper in 2003. It is published by a team of student journalists independent from clubs and student organisations.

===== MUN (Model United Nations) =====
The MUN Club admits its members on an application basis. Students have to write a convincing statement of purpose and score above average at the exam testing general knowledge of the member applicants. There are approximately 60 members of the club.

Each year the MUN Club attends at least five MUN conferences in Turkey and around the world. Some of the conferences participated by the Koç School students in the previous years took place in various parts of the world including the Hague, Cairo, Beijing, Brussels and Paris. MUN Club has been among the most successful clubs in the school with many awards, such as Best Governor, Award of Distinction and Best Delegate in the conferences participated such as Harvard Model Congress Europe

The club also organises a Model United Nations Development Programme conference each year at its campus since 2001. "MUNDP".is the first Model United Nations Development Programme conference in the world, whose establishment in 2001 was celebrated by the former UN Secretary-General Kofi Annan. Each year MUN Delegates from many schools in Turkey and overseas participate in the conference. Each year more than 650 participants attend to the conference as delegates, chairs, advisors, admins and executive committee members. 2017's conference was the 17th session of MUNDP and the participant number exceeded 800 for the first time.

===== Student Council =====
Koç School Student Council is composed of students elected by the student body at the regular elections each year in June. It is composed of 18 students with 6 members from the 12.and 11.grade and 2 representatives from each class at school. The Student Council consists of a school president, vice president, social activities coordinator, finance coordinator, sports coordinator, 1 independent student representative elected from the 12. grade students and a total of 12 representatives elected from grades 9–11 and preparatory year students. The Council meets regularly each week with a faculty adviser. All major and important decisions of the council are to be approved by the faculty adviser even if the meetings are done without the presence of the adviser.

Even though it's criticized of its lack of ability to effect school politics (an example would be the abolishing of Courtyard and building a pyramid instead, which was disliked by many of the students during the time) concerning discipline code, student freedoms etc., it is an active student organization with especially its election campaigns being one of the major events each year.

==== Special events ====
===== Festivals, fairs and performances =====
- Book Fair: Lasts one week. All kinds of books are sold in the school corridors with discount prices. During the fair 8–10 Turkish writers give seminars and speeches(some of the guests in the previous years, including Murathan Mungan, Elif Şafak, Tim Bowler Aydın Boysan, Tuna Kiremitçi, Küçük İskender, Sunay Akın, Feyza Hepçilingirler and Cezmi Ersöz.)
- Science Fair is organized with the contributions of Koç School students and other Istanbul high schools every year. The outcomes of student research projects, experiments and from time to time basic inventions are exhibited.
- Cinema Days: Usually takes place in the last week of school. Several movies are shown in the school auditorium. Turkish actors and actresses visit school for seminars and speeches.
- RamFest: A spring festival of arts and music with contributions from many schools in Istanbul. It usually lasts 1–2 days with several activities held in 3 different places of school: Auditorium is the usual place for classical dance and music; Front garden or Piramit usually reserved for rock and pop bands of high schools; and Halls for exhibition of paintings and other pieces of art created by participants. The Opening Ceremony of the Festival usually hosts professional and amateour performers of different genres like jazz, Latin, classic music or dance such as Ritmiquaa Percussion Group in 2004. After a couple years in which RamFest had not taken place, RamFest was brought back to life in the April 2009.
- SpringFest: Takes place in school campus near the end of the academic year. Alumni, current students, friends, families, faculty come together and enjoy several activities in the festival.
- Musicals: Until 2001, a musical was performed each year with the contributions of the student body and the Arts Department(The Wonderful Wizard of Oz in 1999 being among the greatest performances). Actors and actresses were chosen among many applicants and the musical would be performed after months of preparations. In 2007 a similar project was prepared, named Leader of the Pack. In 2009, Joseph and the Amazing Technicolor Dreamcoat was produced by students and was shown to students and parents.
- Sevgi Gönül Art Night: A night prepared by Koç Students under the guidance of Literature and Arts department to commemorate Sevgi Gönül. The performers are usually picked by the departments from the best participants of Talent Show and RamFest. The night takes place at a Koç Holding building to an audience composed of Koç Family, businessman, artists, academics and friends of Koç family.

===== Student contests =====
- Talent Show: Usually held in spring. Many students become contestants of Talent Show in their years at Koç School. Talent Show Awards, which are given to successful performers by a jury composed of teachers, students, alumni and usually a celebrity, are highly respected and celebrated by the student body and faculty. The Talent Show 2008 was held in the renovated auditorium of the school with an attendance of approximately 700 people, including Mustafa Koç's wife Caroline Koç. American folk musician, guitarist Brooks Williams performed as a special guest in this Talent Show.
- Atakan Demirseren Mathematics Competition: Each year in spring a mathematics competition open to all students is organized by the maths department. The competition includes several eliminations and rounds. The competition includes both a group contest in which groups of students must be the first to correctly answer a question and an individual contest, in which every student has the same time to do the same questions.
- Field Day: It is usually held on a warm autumn day, is an indispensable part of school spirit. Students compete with each other in athletic sports, form their own teams and are awarded according to their performances at the end of the day. The activity has not taken place for the last 3 years due to lack of attendance.

==== Traditions ====
Although Koç School is a relatively young school, it is promising with its traditions adhered by its student body and alumni. Following are notable traditions and traditional activities in the school.

- T.A.W.A: A frequently heard phrase in the school, which also inspired the establishment of the school newspaper T.A.W.A.. Its extended version is: 'This announcement was about .....', a phrase repeated by students each week during the opening and closing ceremonies at the Atakan Demirseren Hall (more commonly AD or auditorium). On Monday after the ceremony and on Friday before the ceremony, announcements regarding school activities, teams, exams are given by the faculty and students. Since the school has international teachers and students, announcements are made in both English and Turkish. Over the years, T.A.W.A has become a cult, listened with smiling faces in the auditorium at each time a student repeats the phrase.
- School trips: To cities and historical places in Turkey, such as Ankara, Çanakkale, Cappadocia are organized each year. Seniors go to Bodrum after the ÖSS as a final to this tradition. There is also a special trip day for the whole school where each class visits a different site in Istanbul and another day where students visit factories and manufacturing centers.
- School parties and Concerts: Each year there are about 3–4 school parties organized by the Student Council. During parties, students spend their time eating the food served at Koç School for the day by famous cafes in Istanbul, and dancing in the auditorium or Piramit.There are also many concerts during the year by rock-bands or pop singers.
- No Uniform Days: In 2008, along with the new high school principal Koray Özsaraç, Thursdays have been permanently changed into "No Uniform Days"; although this is often referred to as a privilege, and it was once cancelled for a month as a punishment for widespread behaviour problems.Nowadays the no-uniform day is Wednesday in the past, these were usually party or festival days when students were permitted to wear clothes other than their uniforms. Students used to pay an amount about 1–2 TL this day and the collected money was either used in helping poor, homeless people or used for the student council budget to organise student activities.

=== Notable alumni ===
- İpek Kıraç – Business woman and heiress to Koç Holding
- Yiğit Kirazcı – Actor
- Pelin Kivrak – Fiction writer and literary scholar
- C. M. Kosemen – Artist and author
- Berrak Tüzünataç – Actress
- Ece Üner – TV presenter and news anchor

Koç School Alumni Association offers several activities for the alumni including homecomings, Summer Picnic at campus, Winter Reunion in Istanbul, and Reunions in Boston, New York and London.

== Elementary school ==
The elementary school was founded in 1998. It was established in order to adapt to the change in the Turkish education system. Education is, again, bilingual in English and Turkish across all grades. Students are taught English language from the earliest years. In Grade 4 and 5 students take extra Science and Maths classes which are taught in English. Starting from the sixth year Science and Math classes are taught in English.

Graduates of the elementary school have the right to continue their education at the high school after taking an exam to skip the preparation year.

== See also ==
- Koç Holding
- Vehbi Koç Foundation
- Koç University
- Robert College
- Üsküdar American Academy
