= Karamfil =

Karamfil Карамфил
- Village
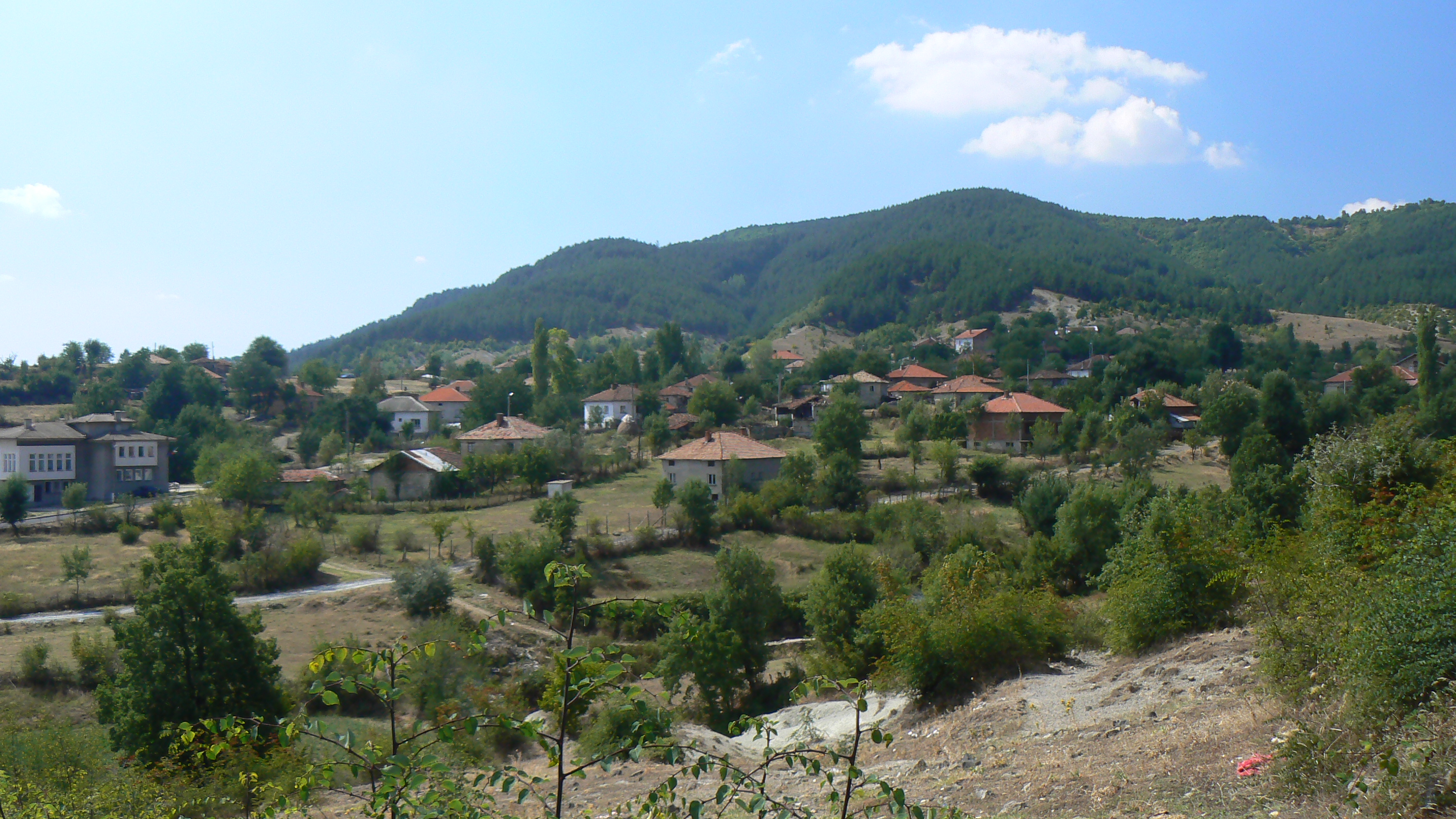
- View overlooking the village

- Location within Bulgaria
- Coordinates: 41.4833°N 25.5667°E
- Country: Bulgaria
- Province: Kardzhali Province
- Municipality: Momchilgrad
- Elevation: 300 m (980 ft)
- Time zone: UTC+2 (EET)
  - Summer (DST): UTC+3 (EEST)

Karamfil is a village in Momchilgrad Municipality, Kardzhali Province, southern Bulgaria. As of 2021 the population stood at 238 residents, with an equal amount of males to females at 119 each.
