= Kos (surname) =

Kos, meaning "blackbird", is a Slavic surname. It is very common in Slovenia, Croatia, Poland, Ukraine, and the Czech Republic.

It is the 10th most common surname in Slovenia. Unlike many other Slovene surnames, Kos is found throughout the country, although it's more common in the central and eastern regions than in the west.

It is the third most common surname in the Zagreb County of Croatia.

== People ==
- Anatoliy Kos-Anatolsky (1909–1983), Ukrainian composer
- Božo Kos (1931–2009), Slovenian illustrator, caricaturist and comics artist
- Ćiril Kos (1919–2003), Croatian Catholic prelate
- Gojmir Anton Kos (1896–1970), Slovenian painter
- Janko Kos (born 1931), Slovenian literary historian
- Joanna Kos-Krauze (born 1972), Polish filmmaker
- Józef Kos (1900–2007), Polish war veteran
- Károly Kós (1883–1977), Hungarian architect
- Maja Kos (born 1968), Serbian synchronized swimmer
- Mile Kos (1925–2014), Serbian footballer
- Milko Kos (1892–1972), Slovenian historian
- Monika Kos (born 1967), Australian journalist
- Paul Kos (born 1942), American conceptual artist
- René Kos (born 1955), Dutch cyclist
- Rudolph Kos (born 1945), American priest
- Stephen Kós (born 1959), New Zealand judge
- Tomasz Kos (born 1974), Polish footballer
- Vladimir Kos (1936–2017), Czech football player
