= Asara Fortress =

Medieval stronghold

- Location within Bulgaria

General information
- Architectural style: Fortress
- Location: Zvezdel, Bulgaria
- Coordinates: 41°28′58″N 25°30′0.12″E
- Construction started: 11th century

The Asara Fortress (Bulgarian: крепост Асара) is a medieval stronghold located about a kilometer southwest from the village Zvezdel in Kardzhali Province of southern Bulgaria. This fortress played a crucial role in defending the land of the Eastern Rhodopes.

== Construction and use ==
The fortress was built between the 11th and 12th centuries and occupied a strategically advantageous location on a rock sanctuary, which also featured a rock tomb from the mid-13th century BC to the 7th-6th centuries BC. This fortification included two rectangular towers on the western and eastern sides, while a wooden palisade encircled the northern and southern perimeters.

The eastern side was fortified with one of two square towers that guarded the entrance to the fortress. The lower floor of this tower was designed as a water reservoir, with its base coated in hydrophobic pink mortar. Additionally, a 20 cm layer of purified sand was found, indicating a filtration system for the water. The floor was intentionally sloped in one corner to facilitate the drainage of precipitation.

In contrast to more common fortifications in the region, the majority of the fortress walls were constructed from wood, a notable rarity in Bulgaria, and particularly at the time the fortress was constructed. The two towers were linked by a rock passageway. Within one of the towers, a chapel was discovered, along with remnants of murals. The fortress was primarily tasked with overseeing and protecting the Zvezdel Mine, which at the time extracted gold and silver. Among the significant archaeological finds were an icon embellished with gold leaf and various bone medallions, some of which are now exhibited at the Regional History Museum in Kardzhali.

The fortress is believed to have fallen during the Bulgarian-Byzantine wars of 1205–1207. Its commanding position, exceptional visibility, and natural defenses made it a crucial asset for Byzantine control over the Eastern Rhodopes.
