= Pelin Kivrak =

Turkish writer and literary scholar

Pelin Kivrak (born 1988) is a fiction writer and literary scholar from Turkey. She won the 2017 Yaşar Nabi Nayır Fiction Award with her first book, Hiçlikte İhtimal Var (There is Possibility in Nothingness).

== Education ==
Kivrak graduated in 2007 from The Koc School in Istanbul, Turkey. She earned her BA in literature from Harvard University in 2011.

== Career ==
After graduating from Harvard, she joined the creative team of The Museum of Innocence in Istanbul. Kivrak received her MPhil and MA from Yale University’s Comparative Literature Department in 2016. She earned her PhD also from Yale University in 2019 with a dissertation on representations of responsibility in contemporary literature and visual arts, and thereafter joined Mahindra Humanities Center at Harvard as a postdoctoral fellow to conduct research on migration and public humanities.

Kivrak's first fiction book, Hiçlikte İhtimal Var, was published in November 2017 in Turkey after her manuscript received the annual Yaşar Nabi Nayır Fiction Award. Politics/Letters Quarterly issued the English translation of the book's first short story, "Dust," in the spring of 2018.

Kivrak regularly writes cultural criticism for the oldest monthly literature and arts journal in Turkey, Varlık. Her articles focus on topics such as mediocrity in contemporary art, disaster geographies and dark tourism, the rise of the novella, theories of readership, and the relationship between aesthetics and attention economies.

Kivrak is a member of Los-Angeles based Refik Anadol Studio, contributing research and curatorial support to multimedia art projects exhibited in the US and abroad.
