= Momchilgrad Museum =

Coordinates: 41°31′34″N 25°24′42″E

Momchilgard Museum
- Музейна сбирка (Момчилград)
- Established: 1969
- Location: 2 Momchil Voyvoda Str. Momchilgrad, Bulgaria
- Type: Museum

The Momchilgrad Museum, known as the Museum collection to "Nov Zhivot" (New Life) community center (Bulgarian: Музейна сбирка при читалище "Нов живот") is a museum in the town of Momchilgrad, southern Bulgaria, established in 1969. It was the first of its kind in Kardzhali Province. The museum showcases roughly 1200 archaeological, ethnographic, and natural exhibits.
