= Eugenia Koss =

Polish ballet dancer (1806–1849)

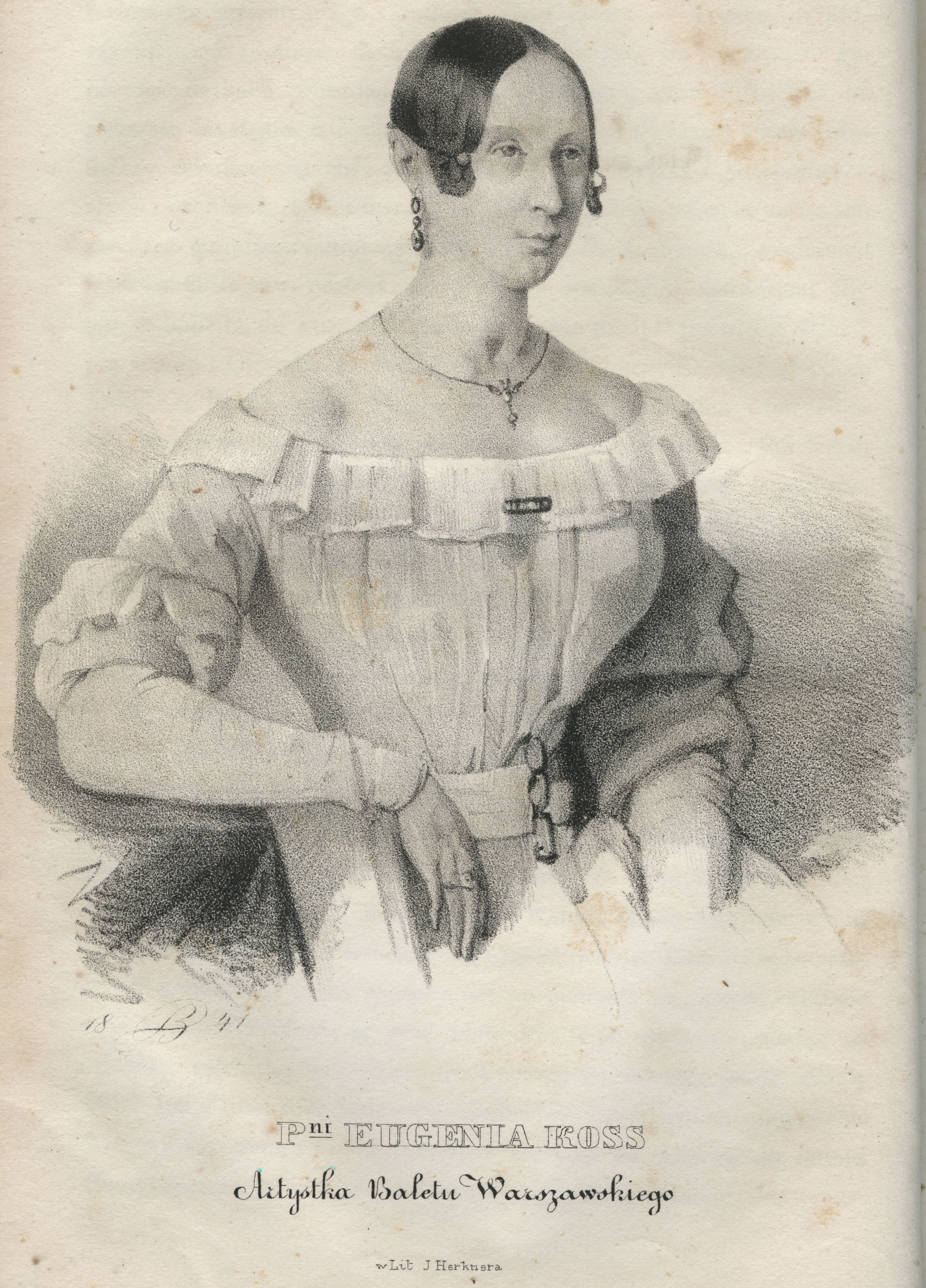

Eugenia Koss (1806 – 1849), was a Polish ballet dancer. She belonged to the more well known ballet dancers in Poland during her career.

She was engaged in the Ballet at the National Theatre, Warsaw between 1828 and 1849.
