= Pelin (village) =

Pelin Пелин
- Village
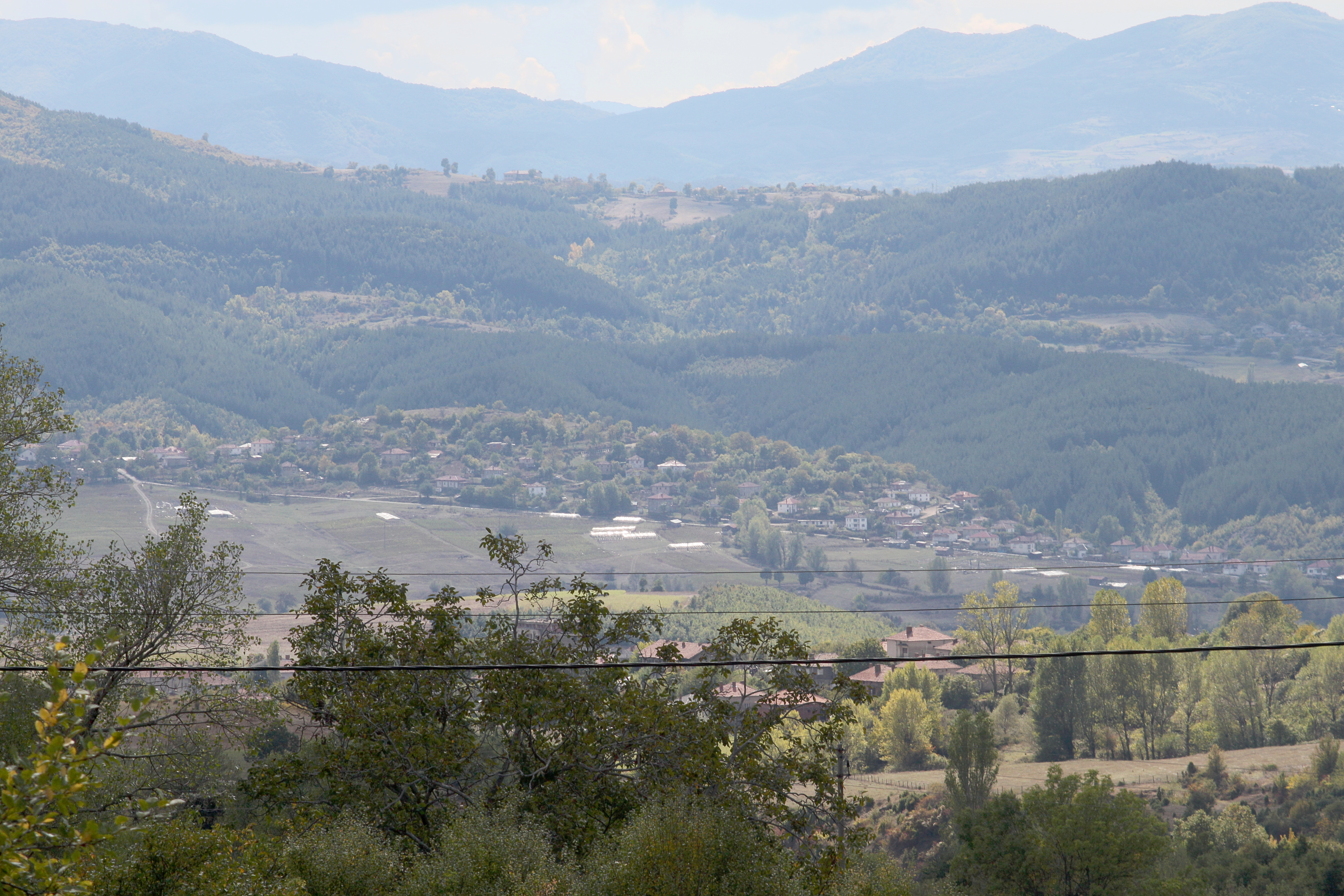
- Pelin

- Location within Bulgaria
- Coordinates: 41.4667°N 25.7333°E
- Country: Bulgaria
- Province: Kardzhali Province
- Municipality: Krumovgrad
- Elevation: 476 m (1,562 ft)

Population (2021)
  - Total: 589
- Time zone: UTC+2 (EET)
  - Summer (DST): UTC+3 (EEST)

Pelin is a village in Krumovgrad Municipality, Kardzhali Province, southern Bulgaria.
