= Wild pear =

Wild pear may refer to:

- European pear, Pyrus communis
- European wild pear, Pyrus pyraster
- South African wild pear, Dombeya rotundifolia
- Australian wild pear, Persoonia falcata
