= Tatul Sanctuary =

Sanctuary in Bulgaria

- Светилище Татул (Bulgarian)
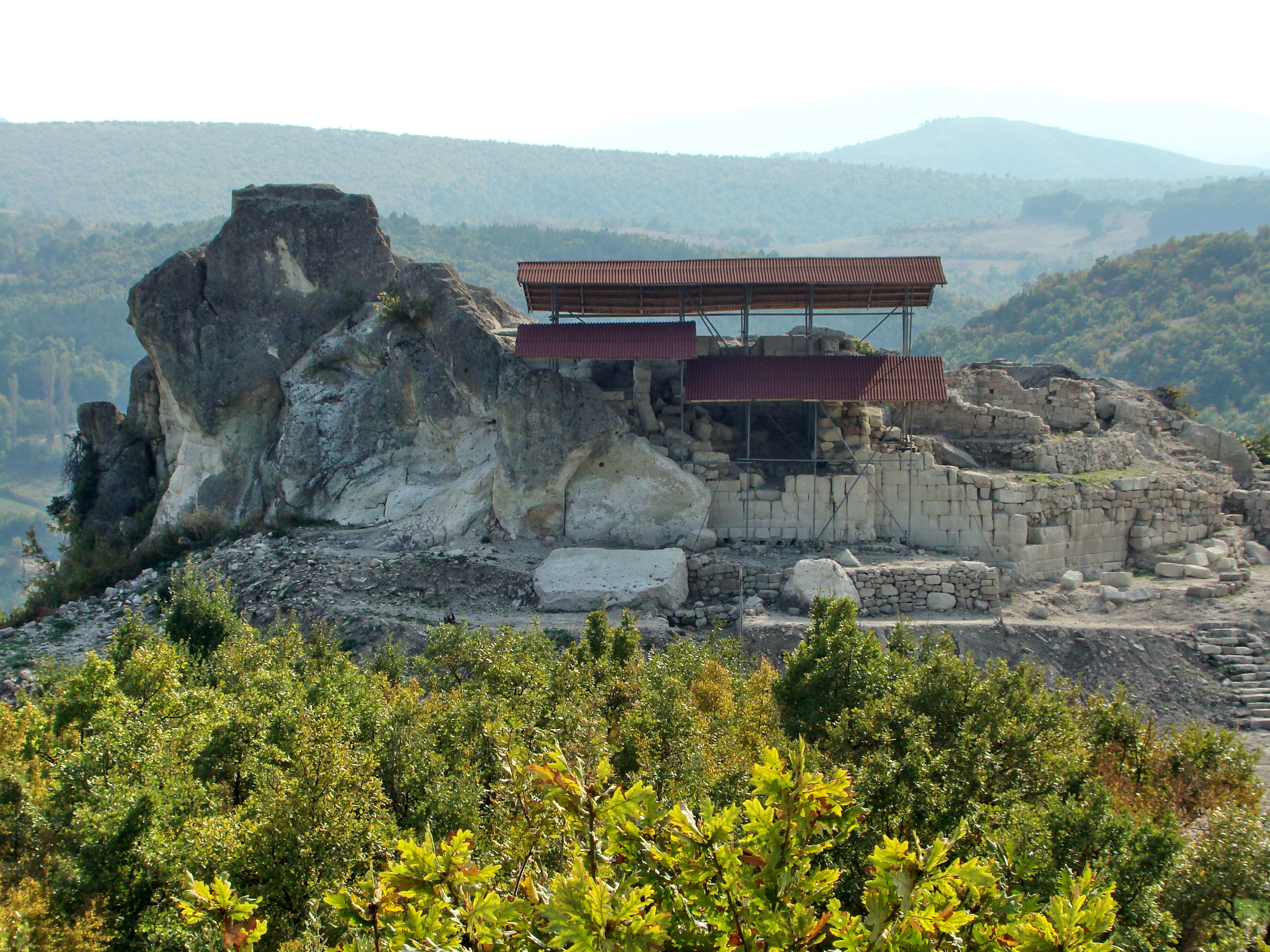
- A view of Tatul

- Location within Bulgaria
- 41°32′30.48″N 25°32′44.16″E
- Type: Sanctuary
- Location: Tatul, Kardzhali Province, Bulgaria

Site notes
- Public access: free

Tatul Sanctuary (Bulgarian: Светилище Татул) is located 15 km (9.32 miles) east of the town of Momchilgrad near the village of Tatul, southern Bulgaria. This Thracian structure is also known as Orpheus' Sanctuary and dates back to the 5th - 4th centuries BC. It is considered to be the second most significant megalithic structure in eastern Rhodope Mountains. Scientists believe this structure was dedicated to Orpheus, while many legends proclaim that he is buried there.

== History and Findings ==
After discovery, the Thracian sanctuary at Tatul quickly became recognized as a significant cultural and historical center for not only Tatul, but Bulgaria as a whole. The earliest settlement at the site is estimated to date back to 4000 BC.

Excavations have unearthed approximately 30 clay altars among other historical artifacts from the 19th and 18th centuries BC; among these was an Iron Age idol, suggesting that the sanctuary was still in use up to 1200BC - 550BC. Additionally, the stone wall constructed around the hill is presumed to have taken place between the 4th and 1st centuries BC, further suggesting use up to this point.

Further development of the site included additional structures from the 2nd to 3rd centuries AD. However, with the Christianization of the Rhodopes in the late 4th to early 5th centuries, a defensive tower was constructed and the purpose of the complex shifted from a place of worship and became the private estate for a local ruler.
