= Tatul =

Tatul Татул
- Village
- Location within Bulgaria
- Coordinates: 41.5536°N 25.5412°E
- Country: Bulgaria
- Province: Kurdzhali Province
- Municipality: Momchilgrad
- Elevation: 319 m (1,047 ft)
- Time zone: UTC+2 (EET)
  - Summer (DST): UTC+3 (EEST)

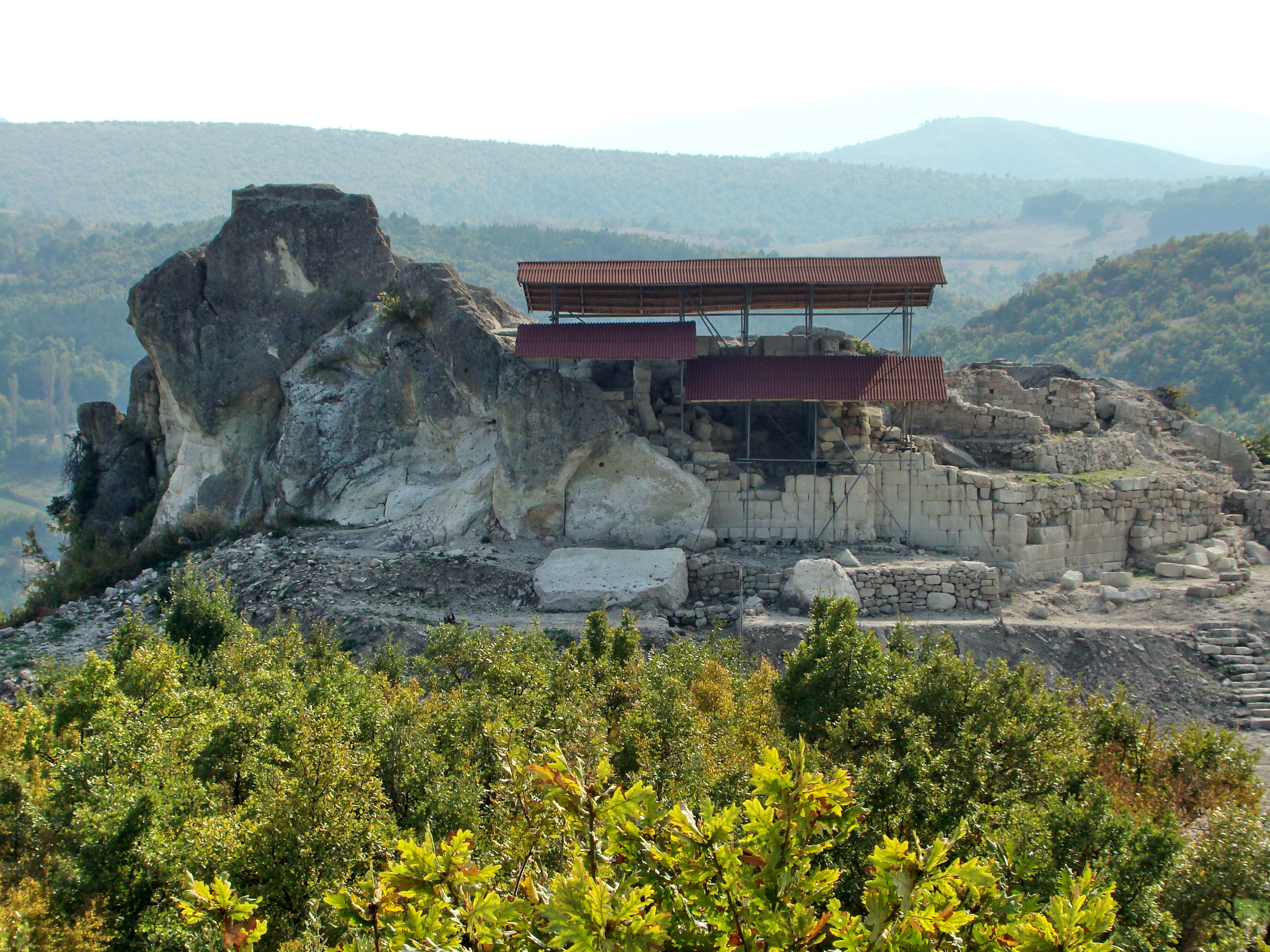
The Sanctuary Hill

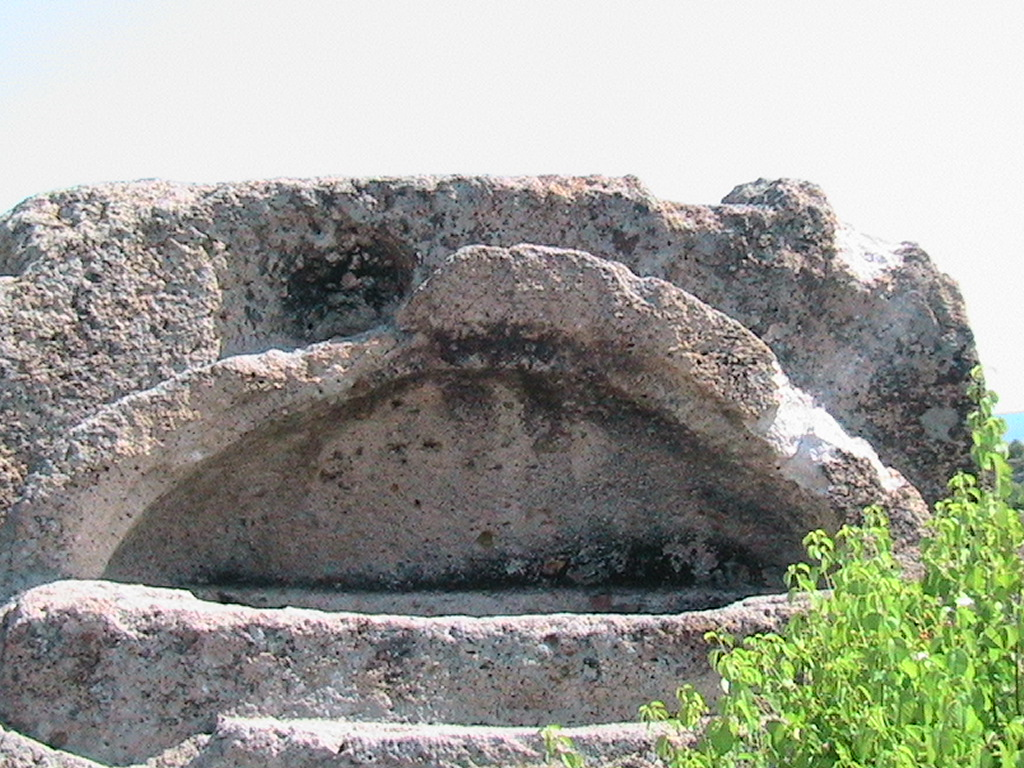
The stone sarcophagus of an important Thracian ruler in Tatul

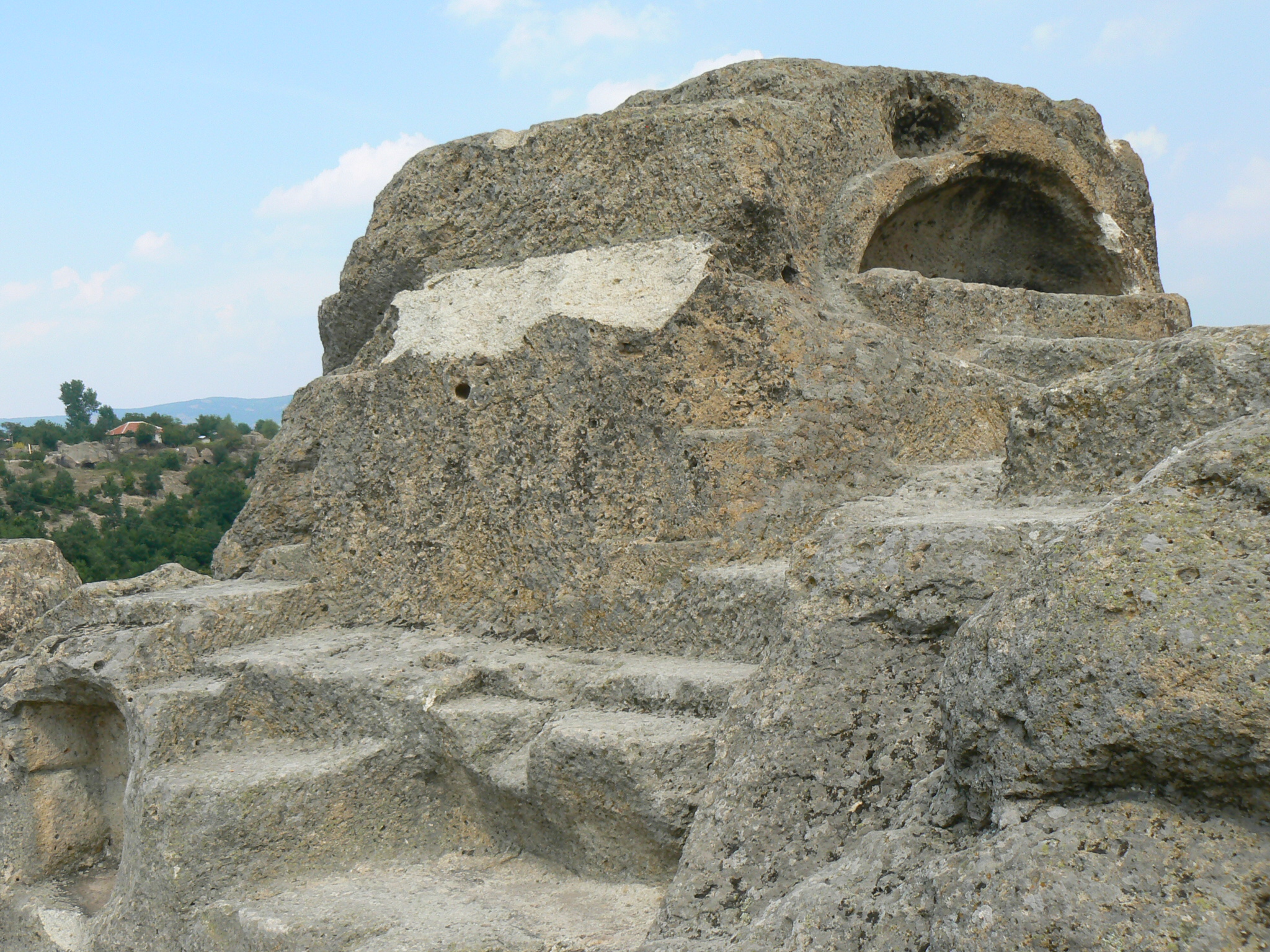
Another view

Tatul (Bulgarian: Татул, the local name for Datura stramonium) is a village in Momchilgrad municipality, Kardzhali Province located in the Eastern Rhodopes in southern Bulgaria. It is lies at 319 m above sea level at 41.5536° N, 25.5412° E, 15 km east of Momchilgrad, and as of September 2005 has a population of 189 people. Most of the houses were built of well-cut stone blocks.

In the 2000s Bulgarian archaeologists discovered an ancient Thracian surface tomb known as the Tatul Sanctuary and sanctuary in the immediate proximity of the village, and it was soon recognized as an exclusive religious center in the region of importance to the whole region according to head archaeologist Nikolay Ovcharov. Latest archaeological finds date the earliest settlement to 4000 BC. According to Ovcharov, the site is the sanctuary and tomb of an influential Thracian leader who was deified after his death. He also links it with the cult of Orpheus.

Around 30 clay altars and other items from the 19th-18th century BC have been excavated, as well as an idol, a nude male figure from the Iron Age, proving the sanctuary was used without interruption in the period. A stone wall was erected surrounding the hill between the 4th and the 1st century BC, and the temple was constructed shortly thereafter, with the religious complex gradually expanding and the religious activity worshipping the man buried in Tatul shifting to the mausoleum that was built. Several new buildings were constructed in the 2nd-3rd century AD and the Christianization of the Rhodopes in the late 4th-early 5th century resulted in the conversion of the complex into a local ruler's domain featuring a defensive tower. The complex also suffered from two earthquakes, once in the 12th century BC and once in the 14th century AD.

As the conservation of the site began shortly after the excavations started, it is developing as a tourist destination, with the infrastructure being renewed and created and the Tatul Thracian complex already welcoming tourists.

== Honour ==
Tatul Island off Robert Island, in the South Shetland Islands is named after Tatul.
