= Raven, Bulgaria =

Raven Равен
- Village
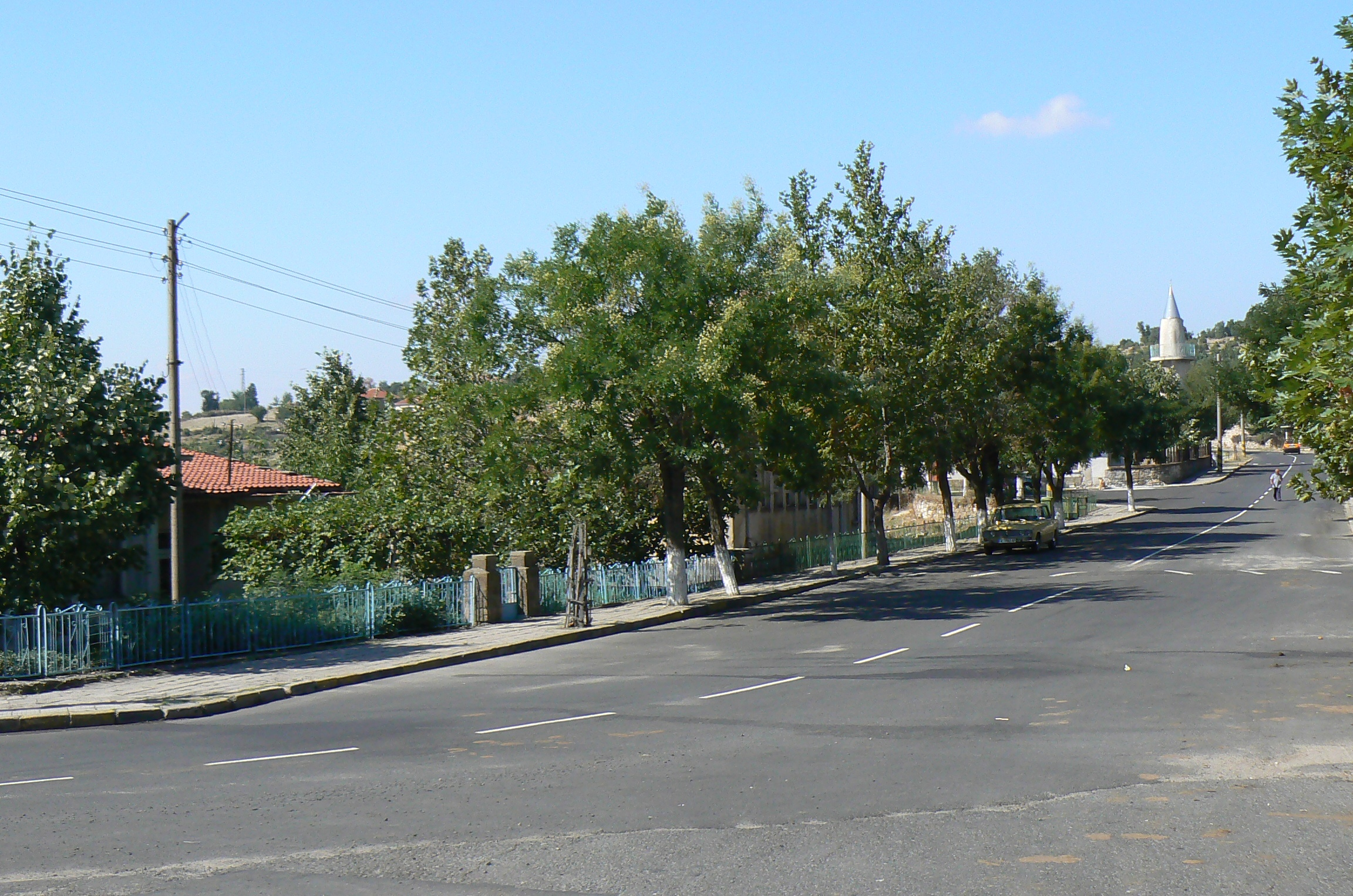

- Location within Bulgaria
- Coordinates: 41.5500°N 25.5000°E
- Country: Bulgaria
- Province: Kardzhali Province
- Municipality: Momchilgrad
- Elevation: 455 m (1,493 ft)
- Time zone: UTC+2 (EET)
  - Summer (DST): UTC+3 (EEST)

Raven is a village in Momchilgrad Municipality, Kardzhali Province, Bulgaria.
