= Momchilgrad Municipality =

Municipality in Kardzhali Province, Bulgaria

Momchilgrad Municipality Община Момчилград
- Municipality
- Location within Bulgaria
- Coordinates: 41°32′N 25°25′E
- Country: Bulgaria
- Province: Kardzhali
- Municipality: Momchilgrad

Area
  - Total: 358.12 km^{2} (138.27 sq mi)

Population (1-Feb-2011)
  - Total: 16,263
  - Density: 45.412/km^{2} (117.62/sq mi)
- Time zone: UTC+2 (EET)
  - Summer (DST): UTC+3 (EEST)
- Website: www.momchilgrad.bg

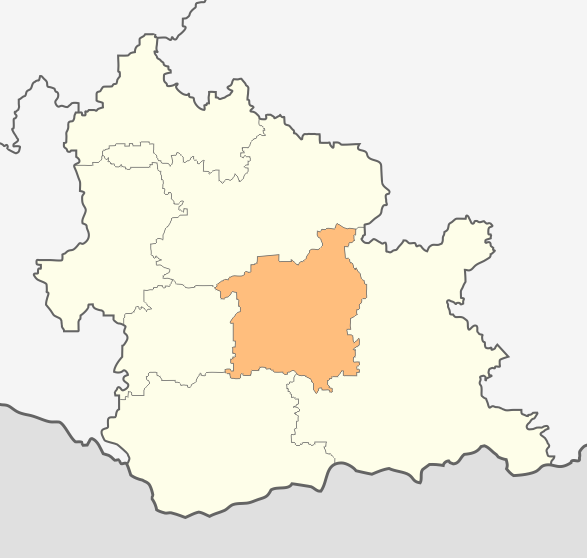
Momchilgrad municipality within Kardzhali Province

Momchilgrad Municipality is a municipality in Kardzhali Province, Bulgaria. The administrative centre is Momchilgrad.

== Demographics ==
=== Religion ===
According to the latest Bulgarian census of 2011, the religious composition, among those who answered the optional question on religious identification, was the following:

Religious composition of Momchilgrad Municipality
| Orthodox Christianity | 5.8% |
| Catholicism | 0.1% |
| Protestantism | 0.0% |
| Islam | 84.8% |
| No religion | 1.4% |
| Prefer not to answer, others and indefinable | 7.9% |
