= Buck =

Buck may refer to:

== Common meanings ==
- A colloquialism for a United States, Canadian, or Australian dollar
- An adult male animal in some species - see List of animal names - e.g.:
  - Goat buck
  - Deer buck
  - Sheep buck
- Derby shoes, nicknamed "bucks" in modern colloquial English, for the common use of buckskin in their making

== Arts and entertainment ==
- BUCK, a My Little Pony fan convention in Manchester, UK
- Buck, someone who excels in the krump dance style
- Buck (film), a 2011 documentary
- Buck (magazine), a defunct UK publication (2008–2011)
- Buck: A Memoir, a 2013 book by MK Asante
- Buck (album), a 2025 album by Red Rum Club

== Companies ==
- Buck (design company), a design-driven creative commercial production company
- Buck (human resources consulting company), a human resources consulting company
- Buck Knives, an American knife manufacturer

== Fictional characters ==
- Buck Mulligan, a character in James Joyce's 1922 novel Ulysses
- Buck Rogers, a science fiction hero introduced in a 1929 comic strip (with later adaptations in other media)
- Buck Russell, the title character in the film Uncle Buck (1989)
- Cameron "Buck" Williams, a reporter introduced in 1995 in the Left Behind multimedia franchise
- Sergeant Buck Frobisher, on the television series Due South (1994–1999)
- Buck Strickland, Hank Hill's manager in King of the Hill (1997–2009)
- Buck (Kiwibank mascot), an anthropomorphic sheep mascot for Kiwibank

== People ==
- Buck (nickname), people nicknamed Buck
- Buck (surname), a list of people

=== First name ===
- Buck Ellison (born 1987), American artist
- Buck Pierce (born 1981), Canadian football quarterback

=== Stage and ring names ===
- Buck 65, Canadian hip hop artist Richard Terfry
- Buck Angel, American trans man, adult film producer and performer Jake Miller (born 1972)
- Buck Dharma, American guitarist Donald Roeser (born 1947)
- Buck Henry, American actor, writer, and director Henry Zuckerman (1930–2020)
- Buck Jones, American film actor Charles Gebhart (1891–1942)
- Buck Owens, American singer and guitarist Alvis Owens Jr. (1929–2006)
- Young Buck, American rapper David Darnell Brown (born 1981)

=== Ring names ===
- Bunkhouse Buck, American professional wrestler James Golden (born 1950)
- Buck Quartermain and Buck Q, American professional wrestler Jason Seguine (born 1967)
- Buck Zumhofe, an American professional wrestler Eugene Otto Zumhofe (born 1951)

== Places in the United States ==
- Buck Creek (disambiguation)
- Buck, Pennsylvania, an unincorporated community
- Buck Township, Hardin County, Ohio
- Buck Township, Luzerne County, Pennsylvania

== Other uses ==
- Buck (cocktail), an alcoholic mixed drink
- Buck (crater), on the planet Venus
- Buck (software), software for building other software
- Buck converter, a converter used to decrease (buck) DC voltage.
- USS Buck, several United States Navy ships

== See also ==
- Bucking, a movement by a horse when the animal kicks out with both hind legs
- Bucks (disambiguation)
- Bucky (disambiguation)
- Buk (disambiguation)
