= Buk =

Buk or BUK may refer to:

== Places ==
=== Czech Republic ===
- Buk (Prachatice District), a municipality and village in the South Bohemian Region
- Buk (Přerov District), a municipality and village in the Olomouc Region
- Buk, a village and part of Jindřichův Hradec in the South Bohemian Region
- Buk, a village and part of Milín in the Central Bohemian Region

=== Poland ===
- Buk, Greater Poland Voivodeship, a town in western Poland
  - Gmina Buk, the administrative unit
- Buk, Podkarpackie Voivodeship, south-east Poland
- Buk, Lesser Poland Voivodeship, south Poland
- Buk, Goleniów County, West Pomeranian Voivodeship, North-west Poland
- Buk, Police County, West Pomeranian Voivodeship, north-west Poland
- Buk Góralski, a village in Kuyavian-Pomeranian Voivodeship, mid-northern Poland
- Buk Pomorski, a village in Kuyavian-Pomeranian Voivodeship, mid-northern Poland

=== Other places ===
- Buk, Bulgaria, a village
- Buk, Croatia, a village
- Bük, a village in Hungary
- Būk, a village in Iran
- Paranesti, a village in Greece formerly called Buk
- Buk District (disambiguation), several districts in South Korea

== People ==
- Choe Buk (fl. 1755–1785), Korean painter
- Tadeusz Buk (1960–2010), Polish soldier, Commander of the Polish Land Forces

== Other uses ==
- Buk (drum), a Korean drum
- BES-5, also known as Buk, a Soviet reactor
- Buk missile system, a Soviet and Russian missile system
- Bukawa language, by ISO 639 code
- Bayero University Kano, Nigeria

== See also ==
- Buk Bak, a Ghanaian musical group
