= Buck (nickname) =

Buck is the nickname of the following people (for fictional characters, see Buck):

== Notable in multiple fields ==
- Lynn Compton (1921–2012), lead prosecutor in Sirhan Sirhan's trial for the assassination of Robert F. Kennedy, California Court of Appeals judge and World War II officer portrayed in the HBO miniseries Band of Brothers
- Robert Halperin (1908–1985), American co-founder of the Lands' End clothing retailer, sailor, National Football League quarterback and US Navy officer during World War II

== In sports ==
=== American football ===
- Buck Gurley (born 1978), American former National Football League (NFL) player
- Buck Jones (American football) (1888–1985), Native American NFL player during the 1922 season
- Frank "Buck" O'Neill (1875–1958), American college football player and Hall-of-Fame coach, also a sprinter
- Buck Shaw (1899–1977), American college football player and NFL head coach

=== Baseball ===
- Harry Buckner (1876–1938), American baseball pitcher and outfielder in the Negro leagues
- Les Burke (1902–1975), American Major League Baseball (MLB) player
- Buck Freeman (1871–1949), American MLB outfielder
- Buck Freeman (pitcher) (1896–1953), American MLB right-handed pitcher
- Jerry Freeman (1879–1952), American MLB first baseman
- Buck Jordan (1907–1993), American MLB player
- Buck Leonard (1907–1997), American baseball player in the Negro leagues, member of the Baseball Hall of Fame
- Buck Martinez (born 1948), American former MLB player and coach
- Willie Mays (born 1931), American former MLB player, member of the Baseball Hall of Fame
- Frank McCormick (1911–1982), American MLB player
- Buck O'Neil (1911–2006), American baseball player and manager in the Negro leagues
- Buck Pressly (1886–1954), American baseball player and manager in the minor leagues
- Lee Rogers (baseball) (1913–1995), American MLB pitcher in the 1938 season
- Buck Rodgers (born 1938), American former MLB catcher and manager
- Buck Showalter (born 1956), American MLB manager and former player
- Zack Wheat (1888–1982), American MLB player, member of the Baseball Hall of Fame
- Kirby White (1884–1943), American MLB pitcher
- Jesse Winters (1893–1986), American MLB pitcher

=== Rugby ===
- Denzil Jones (1926–2010), Welsh rugby union and rugby league footballer
- Buck Shelford (born 1957), New Zealand former rugby union footballer and coach

=== Other ===
- Buck Baker (1919–2002), American race car driver, member of the NASCAR Hall of Fame
- Buck Brannaman (born 1962), American horse trainer
- Buck Canel (1906–1980), American sportscaster
- Alvin Jones (ice hockey) (1917–2007), Canadian National Hockey League player
- Peter Stewart (cricketer) (1730–1796), English cricketer
- Buck White (golfer) (1911–1982), American golfer

== Military officers ==
- Albert Elton (fl. 1989–2020), retired United States Air Force major general
- Elliott Buckmaster (1889–1977), US Navy vice admiral and aviator
- William F. Kernan (born 1946), US Army retired general
- Charles T. Lanham (1902–1978), US Army major general, friend of Ernest Hemingway and model for one of the writer's heroes
- William McCandless (1834–1884), Union Army colonel who fought in the American Civil War
- William R. Terry (1827-1897), commander of Virginian militia and CS general
- Buck McNair (1919-1971), Canadian Second World War flying ace
- Charles C. Pattillo (1924-2019), American Air Force lieutenant general
- Jonathan Rogers (GC) (1920–1964), Welsh-born Royal Australian Navy sailor awarded the George Cross
- Donald Schmuck (1915–2004), US Marine Corps brigadier general
- Earl Van Dorn (1820–1863), US Army officer and American Civil War Confederate Army general

== In music ==
- Buck Clarke (1934–1988), American jazz percussionist
- Buck Clayton (1911–1991), American jazz trumpeter
- Josh Graves (1927–2006), American bluegrass musician
- Buck Owens (1929–2006), American country musician
- Buck Ram (1907–1991), American songwriter and music producer
- Buck Dharma (1947–present), American songwriter and guitarist

== Politicians and lawyers ==
- Ulysses S. Grant, Jr. (1852-1929), American attorney and entrepreneur, second son of President Ulysses S. Grant
- Constantine B. Kilgore (1835–1897), American politician
- Buck Rinehart (1946-2015), mayor of Columbus, Ohio (1984–1992)
- William M. Walton (1832–1915), American lawyer, Attorney General of Texas, politician and Confederate Army major
- Thomas Whaley (politician) (1765–1800), Irish gambler and politician

== Criminals ==
- Buck Barrow (1903–1933), member of the Barrow Gang, older brother of Clyde Barrow (of Bonnie and Clyde fame)
- Buck English (died 1915), American Old West outlaw

== Other ==
- Buck Choquette (1830–1898), French-Canadian prospector who made the 1861 gold strike which led to the Stikine Gold Rush
- James Buchanan Duke (1856–1925), American industrialist and philanthropist for whom Duke University is named
- David Paul Grove (born 1958), Canadian actor and voice actor
- Buck Jones (1891–1942), American actor, stuntman and cowboy
- Buck Angel (born 1962), American adult film actor and producer and motivational speaker
- Michael Buckley (Internet celebrity) (born 1975), American Internet celebrity, comedian and vlogger
- Jacob Lowe, star of the TV series Mountain Monsters

== See also ==
- Old Buck (disambiguation)
- Bucks (disambiguation)
- Bucky (disambiguation)
