= Szczepanki =

Szczepanki may refer to:

- Szczepanki, Brodnica County in Kuyavian-Pomeranian Voivodeship (north-central Poland)
- Szczepanki, Grudziądz County in Kuyavian-Pomeranian Voivodeship (north-central Poland)
- Szczepanki, Przasnysz County in Masovian Voivodeship (east-central Poland)
- Szczepanki, Sierpc County in Masovian Voivodeship (east-central Poland)
- Szczepanki, Warmian-Masurian Voivodeship (north Poland)
