= Goralski =

Goralski may refer to:

- Buk Góralski, a village in Kuyavian-Pomeranian Voivodeship, north-central Poland
- Jacek Góralski (1992), Polish professional footballer
- Robert Goralski (1928–1988), American journalist
- Zoey Goralski (1995), American former soccer player
