= Piecewo =

Piecewo may refer to the following places:

- Piecewo, Greater Poland Voivodeship (west-central Poland)
- Piecewo, Kuyavian-Pomeranian Voivodeship (north-central Poland)
- Piecewo, Pomeranian Voivodeship (north Poland)
