= Płowęż =

- Village
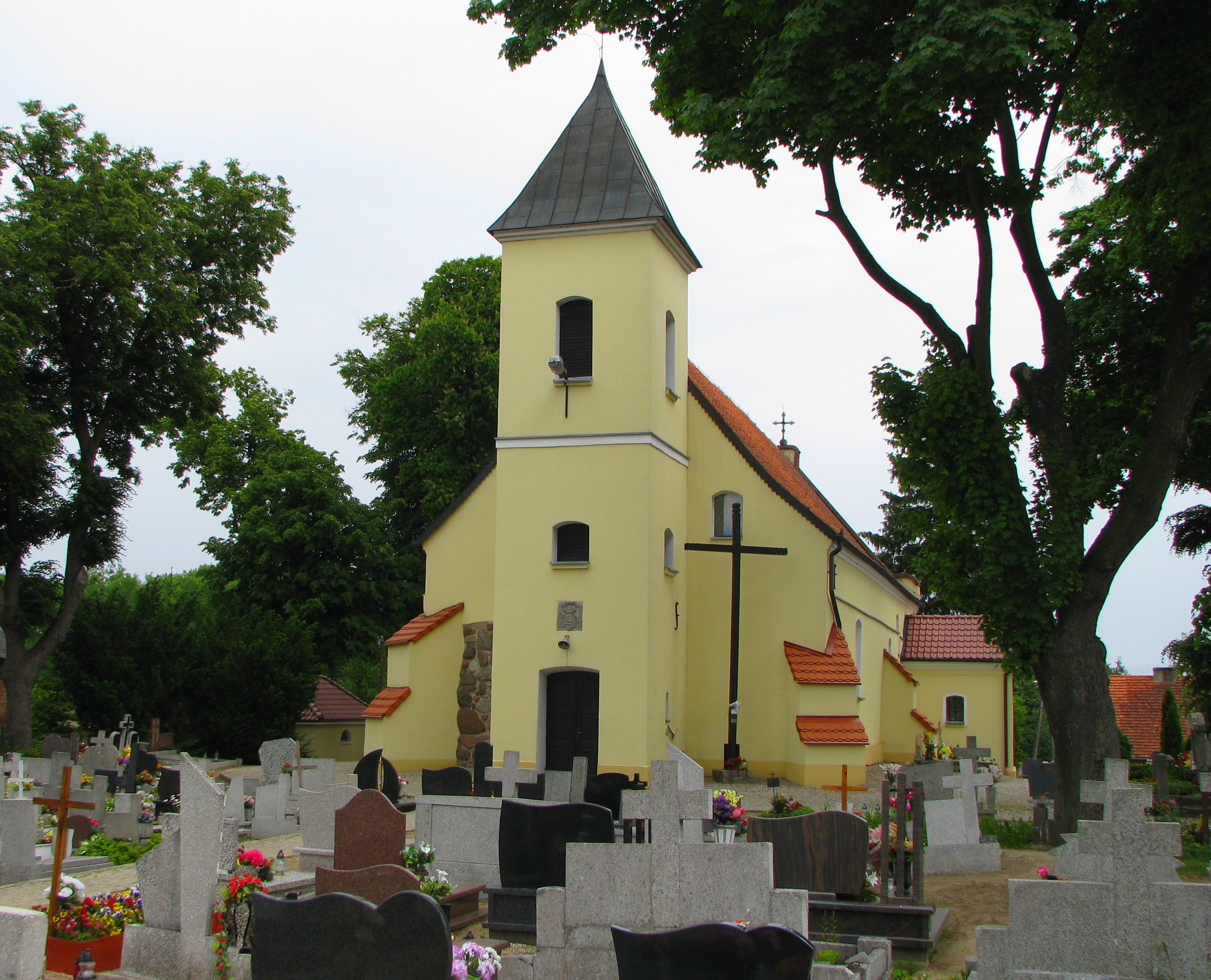

- Location within Poland
- Coordinates: 53°27′N 19°14′E
- Country: Poland
- Voivodeship: Kuyavian-Pomeranian
- County: Brodnica
- Gmina: Jabłonowo Pomorskie

Płowęż [ˈpwɔvɛ̃ʂ] is a village in the administrative district of Gmina Jabłonowo Pomorskie, within Brodnica County, Kuyavian-Pomeranian Voivodeship, in north-central Poland.
