= Gmina Jabłonowo Pomorskie =

Gmina Jabłonowo Pomorskie Jabłonowo Pomorskie Commune
- Gmina
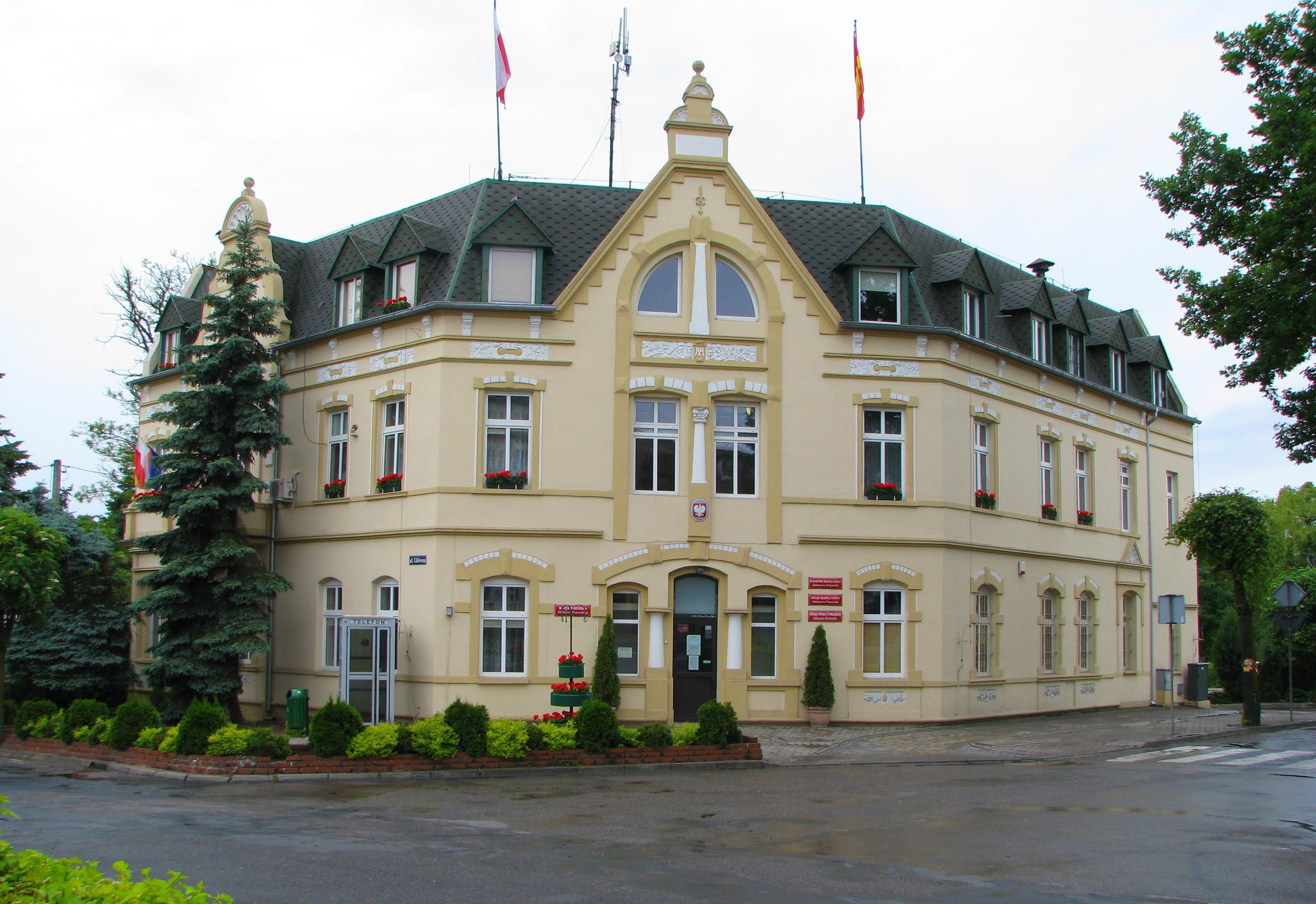
- Town Hall in Jabłonowo Pomorskie, seat of the gmina office

- Flag Coat of arms
- Interactive map of Gmina Jabłonowo Pomorskie
- Coordinates (Jabłonowo Pomorskie): 53°23′31″N 19°9′24″E
- Country: Poland
- Voivodeship: Kuyavian-Pomeranian
- County: Brodnica
- Seat: Jabłonowo Pomorskie

Area
  - Total: 134.36 km^{2} (51.88 sq mi)

Population (2011)
  - Total: 9,121
  - Density: 67.88/km^{2} (175.8/sq mi)
  - Urban: 3,858
  - Rural: 5,263
- Time zone: UTC+1 (CET)
  - Summer (DST): UTC+2 (CEST)
- Vehicle registration: CBR
- Website: http://www.jablonowo.com/

Gmina Jabłonowo Pomorskie is an urban-rural gmina (administrative district) in Brodnica County, Kuyavian-Pomeranian Voivodeship, in north-central Poland. Its seat is the town of Jabłonowo Pomorskie, which lies approximately 23 kilometres (14 mi) north-west of Brodnica and 54 km (34 mi) north-east of Toruń.

The gmina covers an area of 134.36 square kilometres (51.9 sq mi), and as of 2006 its total population is 9,060 (out of which the population of Jabłonowo Pomorskie amounts to 3,658, and the population of the rural part of the gmina is 5,402).

The gmina contains parts of the protected areas of Brodnica Landscape Park and Górzno-Lidzbark Landscape Park.

== Villages ==
Apart from the town of Jabłonowo Pomorskie, Gmina Jabłonowo Pomorskie contains the villages and settlements of Adamowo, Budziszewo, Buk Góralski, Buk Pomorski, Bukowiec, Górale, Gorzechówko, Jabłonowo-Zamek, Kamień, Konojady, Lembarg, Mileszewy, Nowa Wieś, Piecewo, Płowęż and Szczepanki.

== Neighbouring gminas ==
Gmina Jabłonowo Pomorskie is bordered by the gminas of Biskupiec, Bobrowo, Książki, Świecie nad Osą and Zbiczno.
