= Buckey =

Buckey may refer to:

- Buckey Lasek also known as Bucky Lasek (born 1972), professional skateboarder
- Buckey O'Neill (1860–1898), American soldier, sheriff, newspaper editor, miner, politician, gambler and lawyer, mainly in Arizona, USA
- Buckey Staggers also known as Harley O. Staggers, Jr. (born 1951), Democratic U.S. politician
- Jay C. Buckey (born 1956), American physician, engineer, and astronaut who flew aboard one space shuttle mission (STS-90) as a Payload Specialist
- Jeff Buckey, professional American football player who played offensive lineman for four seasons
- Peggy McMartin Buckey, known in connection with the McMartin preschool trial, a day care sexual abuse case of the 1980s

== See also ==
- Buckey O'Neill Cabin, built in 1890 by William "Buckey" O'Neill in what would become Grand Canyon National Park
- Buckey O'Neill monument, equestrian sculpture by Solon Borglum at Courthouse Plaza, Prescott, Arizona, USA
- Kitterman-Buckey Farm, historic home and farm complex located at Johnsville, Frederick County, Maryland, USA
- Buc-ee's
- Buckie (disambiguation)
- Bucky (disambiguation)
