= Adamowo, Brodnica County =

- Village
- Location within Poland
- Coordinates: 53°25′32″N 19°10′25″E
- Country: Poland
- Voivodeship: Kuyavian-Pomeranian
- County: Brodnica
- Gmina: Jabłonowo Pomorskie

Adamowo [adaˈmɔvɔ] is a village in the administrative district of Gmina Jabłonowo Pomorskie, within Brodnica County, Kuyavian-Pomeranian Voivodeship, in north-central Poland.
