= Bukowiec, Brodnica County =

Bukowiec
- Village
- Location within Poland
- Coordinates: 53°21′1″N 19°8′35″E
- Country: Poland
- Voivodeship: Kuyavian-Pomeranian
- County: Brodnica
- Gmina: Jabłonowo Pomorskie

Bukowiec [buˈkɔvjɛt͡s] is a village in the administrative district of Gmina Jabłonowo Pomorskie, within Brodnica County, Kuyavian-Pomeranian Voivodeship, in north-central Poland.
