= Gorzechówko =

- Village
- Location within Poland
- Coordinates: 53°23′15″N 19°12′39″E
- Country: Poland
- Voivodeship: Kuyavian-Pomeranian
- County: Brodnica
- Gmina: Jabłonowo Pomorskie

Gorzechówko [ɡɔʐɛˈxufkɔ] (German: Hochheim) is a village in the administrative district of Gmina Jabłonowo Pomorskie, within Brodnica County, Kuyavian-Pomeranian Voivodeship, in north-central Poland.

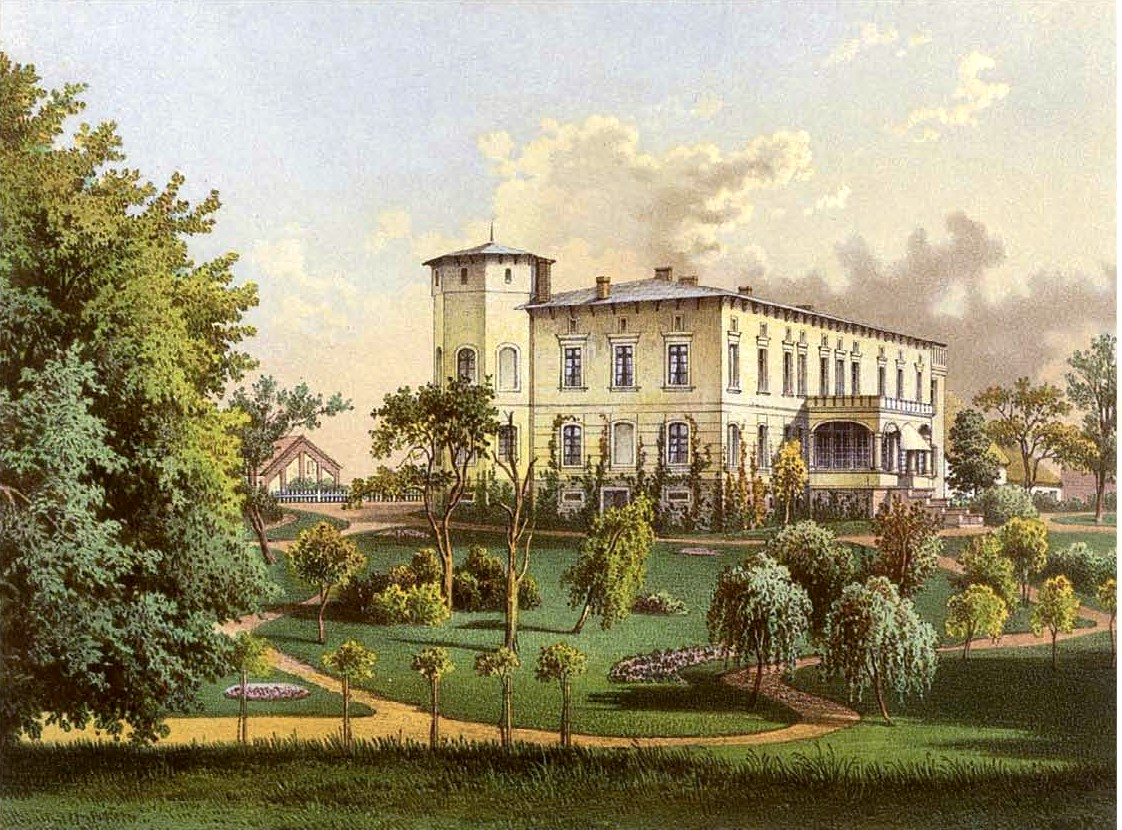
Castle (destroyed 1945)
