= Buckie (disambiguation) =

Buckie is a Scottish burgh town. Buckie may also refer to:

== Associated with the town ==
- Buckie (ward), an electoral ward
- Buckie High School
- Buckie railway station, a former station
- Buckie railway station (Highland Railway), a former station
- Buckie Rovers F.C., a former football club

== Other uses ==
- Anthony Buckie Leach (1958–2021), American foil fencing coach and fencer
- Buckie, in the southern hemisphere another name for the gravity bong, used for consuming smokable substances

== See also ==
- Buc-ee's
- Bucky (disambiguation)
- Buckey (disambiguation)
