= Górale, Kuyavian-Pomeranian Voivodeship =

Górale
- Village
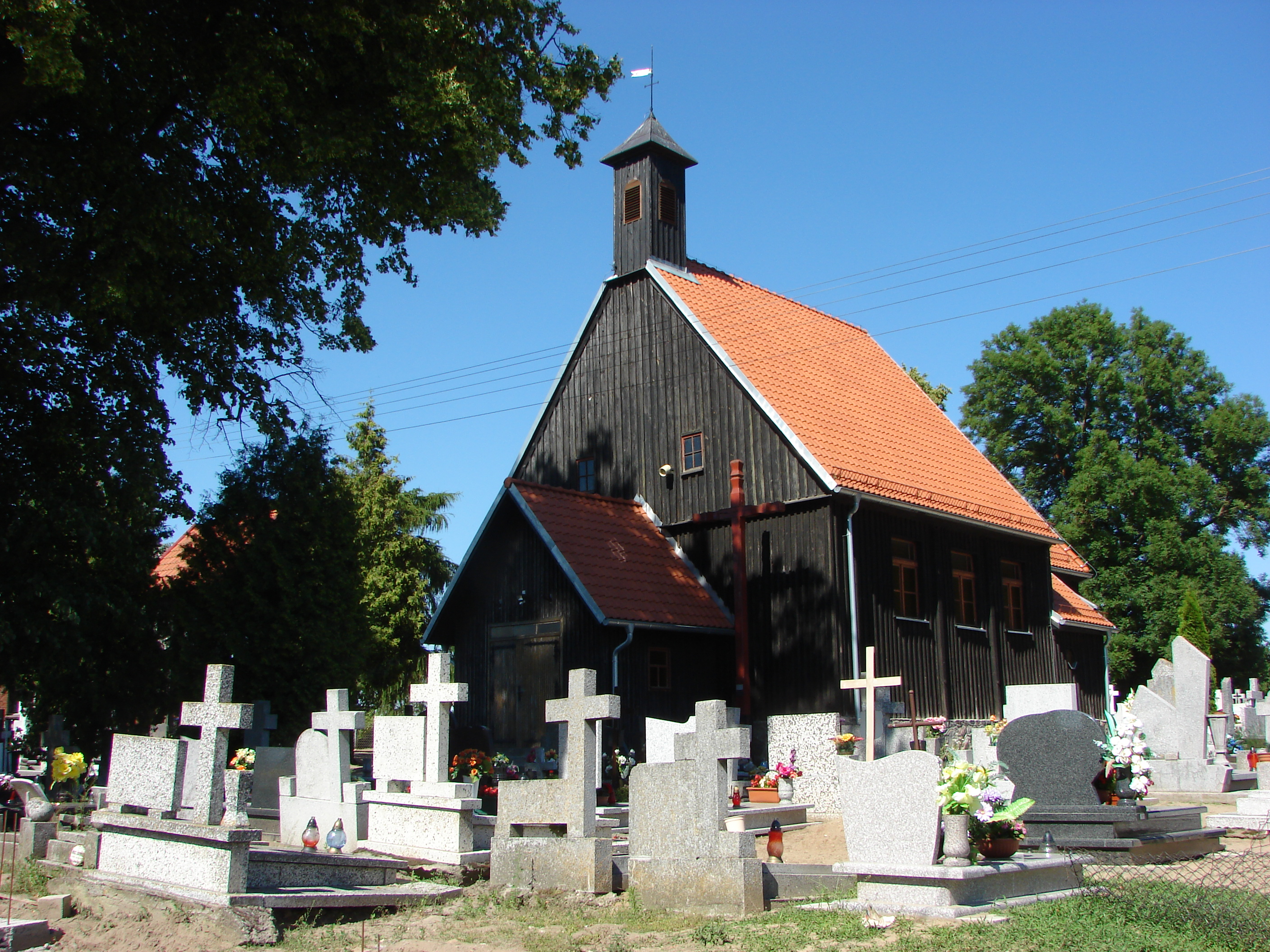
- Parish church of Saint Martin, built 1723.

- Location within Poland
- Coordinates: 53°23′7″N 19°14′34″E
- Country: Poland
- Voivodeship: Kuyavian-Pomeranian
- County: Brodnica
- Gmina: Jabłonowo Pomorskie

Górale [ɡuˈralɛ] is a village in the administrative district of Gmina Jabłonowo Pomorskie, within Brodnica County, Kuyavian-Pomeranian Voivodeship, in north-central Poland.
