= Buk, Bulgaria =

Buk Бук
- Village
- Location within Bulgaria
- Coordinates: 41.3500°N 25.5500°E
- Country: Bulgaria
- Province: Kardzhali Province
- Municipality: Krumovgrad
- Elevation: 407 m (1,335 ft)
- Time zone: UTC+2 (EET)
  - Summer (DST): UTC+3 (EEST)

Buk is a village in Krumovgrad Municipality, Kardzhali Province, southern Bulgaria.

== Landmarks ==
About 47 km (29.2 miles) from Buk, near Tatul, you can see the Sanctuary of Orpheus. This place has an old pagan temple, a medieval fortress, and a tomb cut into the rock. The tomb has steps leading to it and is thought to be where the mythic figure Orpheus might be buried.

To the west, 42 km (26 miles) from Tatul, is Benkovski village. Here, there is a recently fixed mosque where local Muslims go to pray. There's also a very old oak tree, over 200 years old, and some big rocks shaped like a crocodile, a mushroom, and a lion's head.

About 30 km (18.6 miles) northeast from Benkovski, near Rogach, is the Rock Tomb-Sanctuary. It is on the right side of the Krumovitsa River and is called Guyu or Kuyu by locals. Two small holes in the rock that look like footprints are considered sacred and are known as "The steps of Ali."

Finally, around 25 km (15.5 miles) northwest of Bryagovets, in Stareyshino, you can visit the Dome Tomb called Punar Kaya. This tomb has two stone basins carved into the rock where water collects. Locals think the water and the site are special and have healing powers.
