= Mileszewy =

- Village
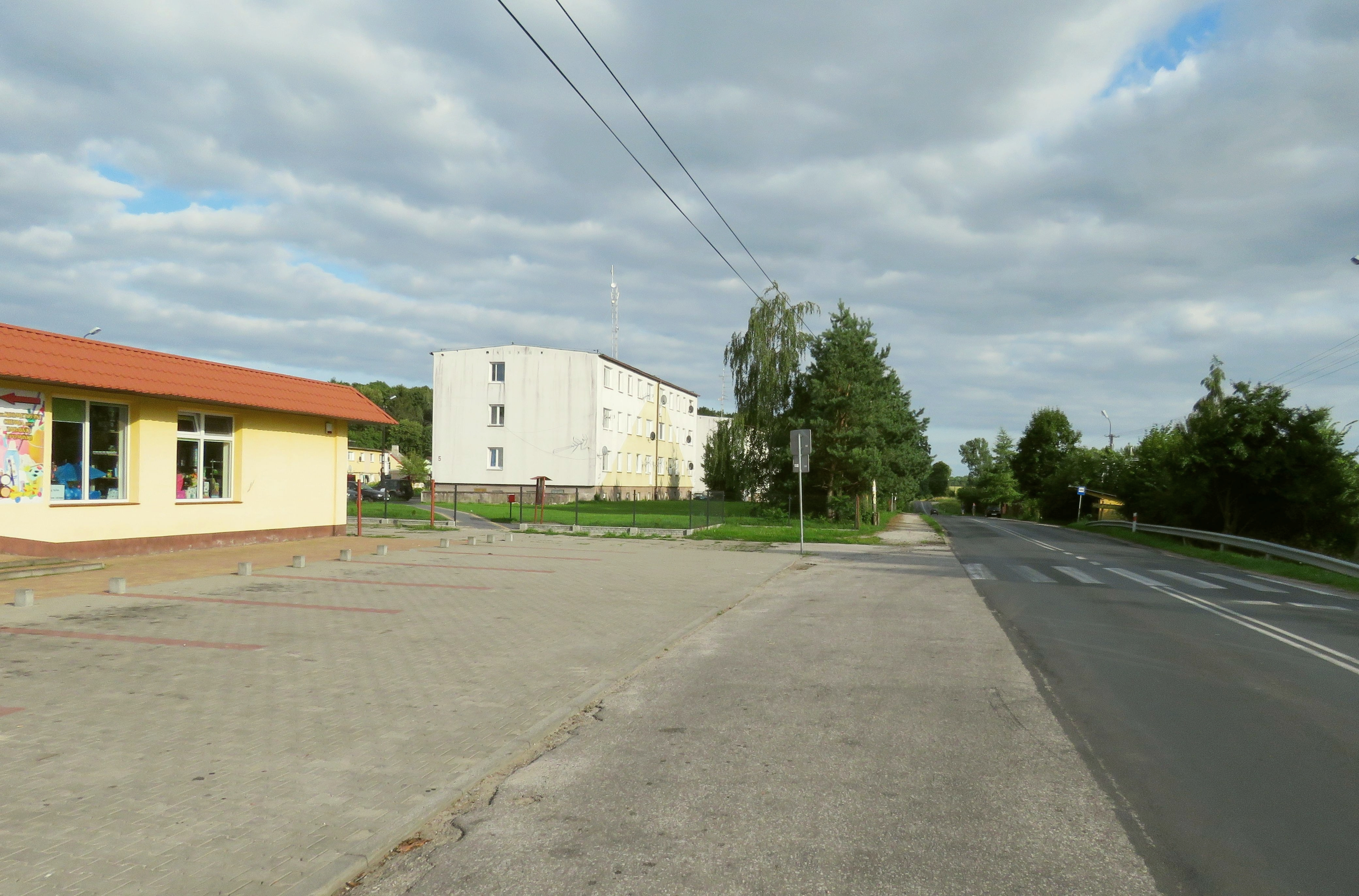
- Roadside buildings in Mileszewy

- Location within Poland
- Coordinates: 53°20′37″N 19°12′51″E
- Country: Poland
- Voivodeship: Kuyavian-Pomeranian
- County: Brodnica
- Gmina: Jabłonowo Pomorskie

Mileszewy [milɛˈʂɛvɨ] is a village in the administrative district of Gmina Jabłonowo Pomorskie, within Brodnica County, Kuyavian-Pomeranian Voivodeship, in north-central Poland.
