= Jabłonowo-Zamek =

- Village
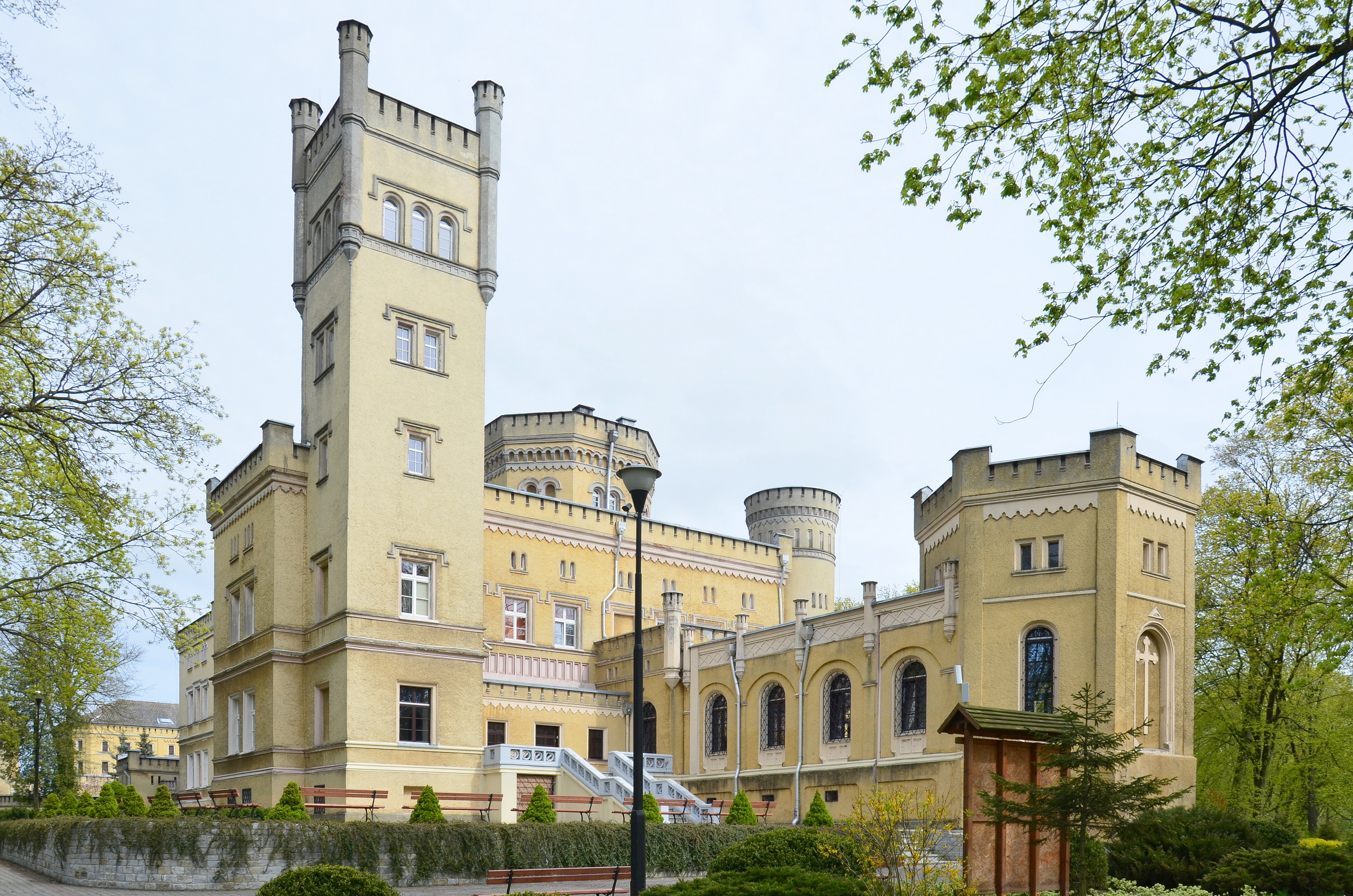
- Narzymski Palace in Jabłonowo-Zamek

- Location within Poland
- Coordinates: 53°23′13″N 19°8′20″E
- Country: Poland
- Voivodeship: Kuyavian-Pomeranian
- County: Brodnica
- Gmina: Jabłonowo Pomorskie
- Time zone: UTC+1 (CET)
  - Summer (DST): UTC+2 (CEST)
- Vehicle registration: CBR

Jabłonowo-Zamek [jabwɔˈnɔvɔ ˈzamɛk] is a village in the administrative district of Gmina Jabłonowo Pomorskie, within Brodnica County, Kuyavian-Pomeranian Voivodeship, in north-central Poland. It is located in the Chełmno Land in the historic region of Pomerania.

The historic landmarks of the village are the Narzymski Palace and the Saint Adalbert church.

== History ==
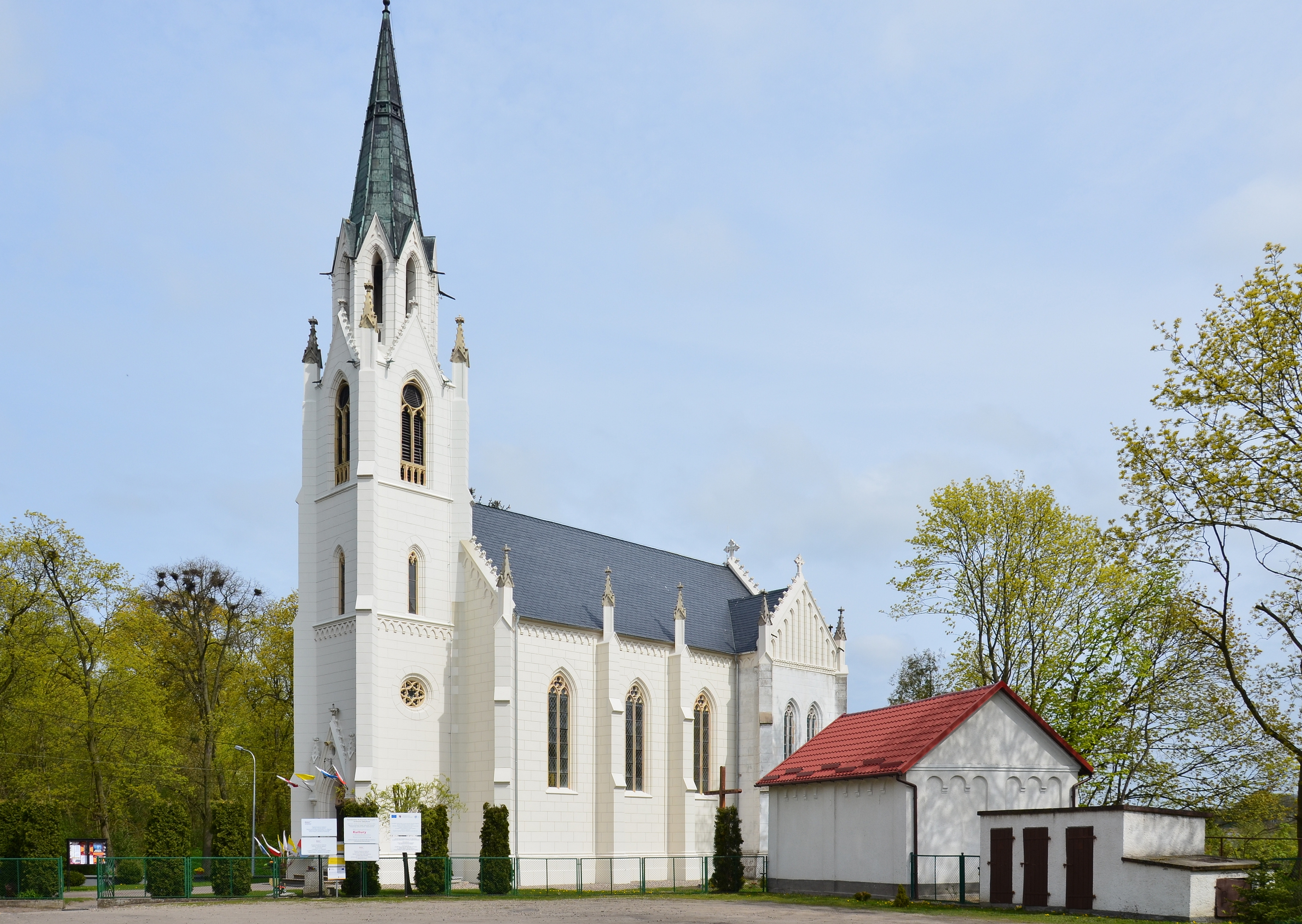
Saint Adalbert church

The oldest known mention of Jabłonowo comes from a document issued by Duke Konrad I of Masovia of the Polish Piast dynasty in 1222.

Following the joint German-Soviet invasion of Poland, which started World War II in September 1939, it was invaded and then occupied by Germany until 1945. From 1941 to 1943, Germany operated a Germinisation camp for Poles expelled from various places in Kuyavia and Pomerania, who were classified racially valuable by the occupiers.
