= Lembarg =

- Village
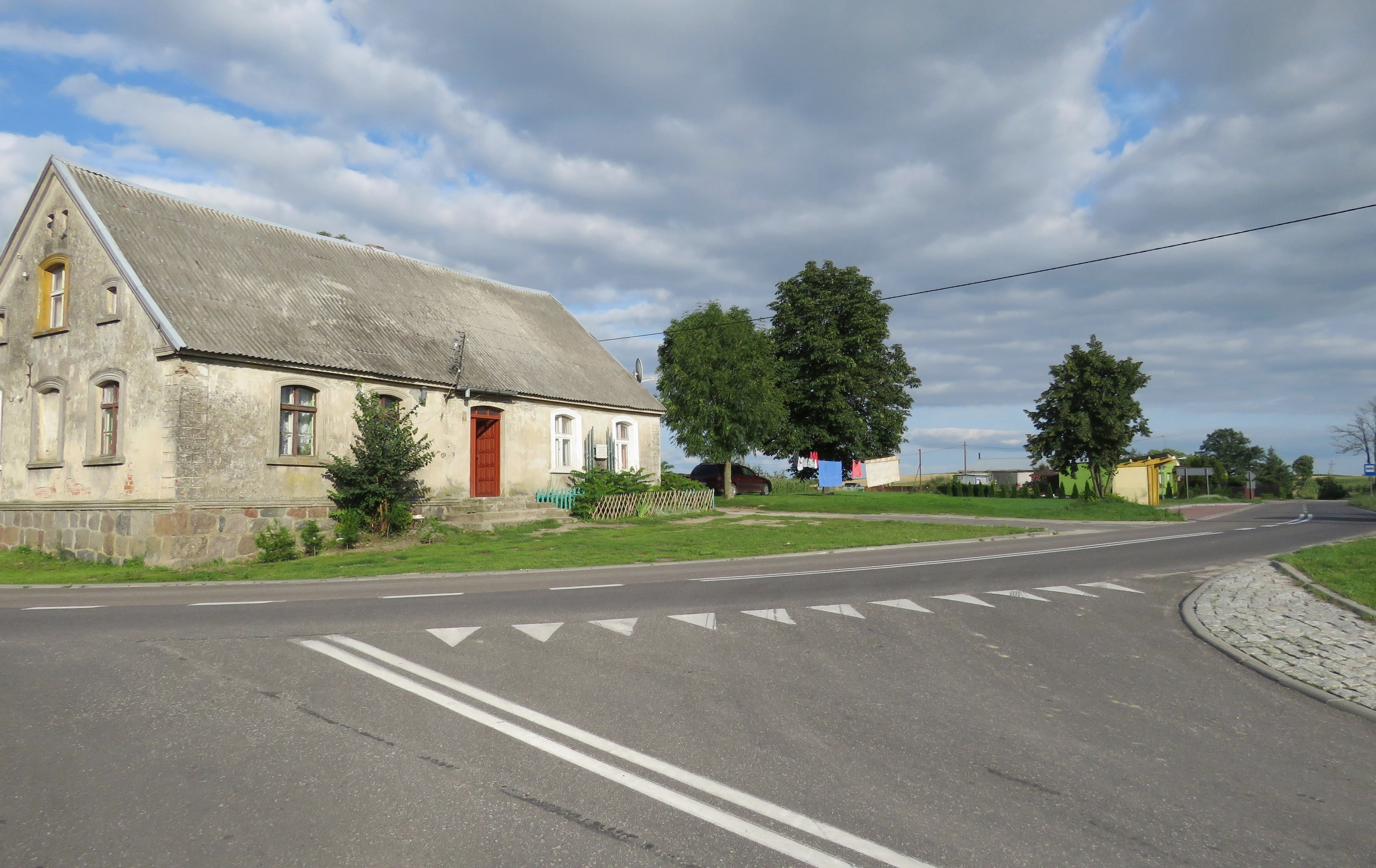

- Location within Poland
- Coordinates: 53°21′N 19°12′E
- Country: Poland
- Voivodeship: Kuyavian-Pomeranian
- County: Brodnica
- Gmina: Jabłonowo Pomorskie
- Time zone: UTC+1 (CET)
  - Summer (DST): UTC+2 (CEST)
- Vehicle registration: CBR

Lembarg [ˈlɛmbark] is a village in the administrative district of Gmina Jabłonowo Pomorskie, within Brodnica County, Kuyavian-Pomeranian Voivodeship, in north-central Poland.

== History ==
During the German occupation of Poland (World War II), Lembarg was one of the sites of executions of Poles, carried out by the Germans in 1939 as part of the Intelligenzaktion. Local Poles were also among the victims of the massacre in Brzezinki, perpetrated by the German police and Selbstschutz in October 1939, also as part of the Intelligenzaktion.
