= Jabłonowo Pomorskie =

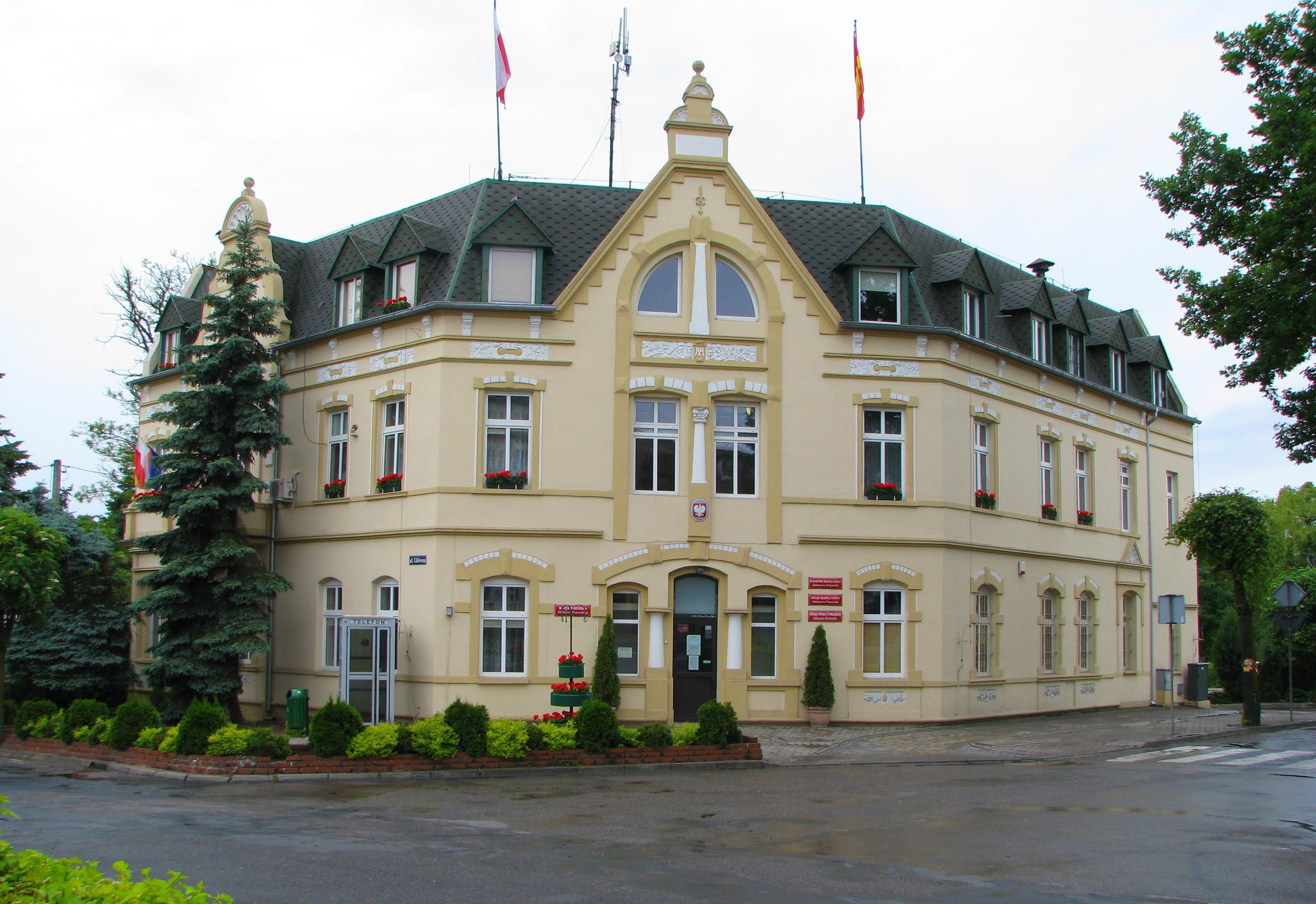
- Town hall

- Flag Coat of arms

- Location within Poland
- Coordinates: 53°23′31″N 19°9′24″E
- Country: Poland
- Voivodeship: Kuyavian-Pomeranian
- County: Brodnica
- Gmina: Jabłonowo Pomorskie
- First mentioned: 1222

Area
  - Total: 3.35 km^{2} (1.29 sq mi)
- Elevation: 80 m (260 ft)

Population (2025)
  - Total: 3,635
  - Density: 1,090/km^{2} (2,810/sq mi)
- Time zone: UTC+1 (CET)
  - Summer (DST): UTC+2 (CEST)
- Postal code: 87-330
- Vehicle registration: CBR

Jabłonowo Pomorskie (Polish pronunciation: [jabwɔˈnɔvɔ pɔˈmɔrskʲɛ]; German: Jablonowo, 1903-1945: Goßlershausen) is a town in the Brodnica powiat of the Kuyavian-Pomeranian Voivodeship, in northern Poland. As of 2018, the town had a population of 3,783. It is located in the Chełmno Land in the historic region of Pomerania.

== History ==
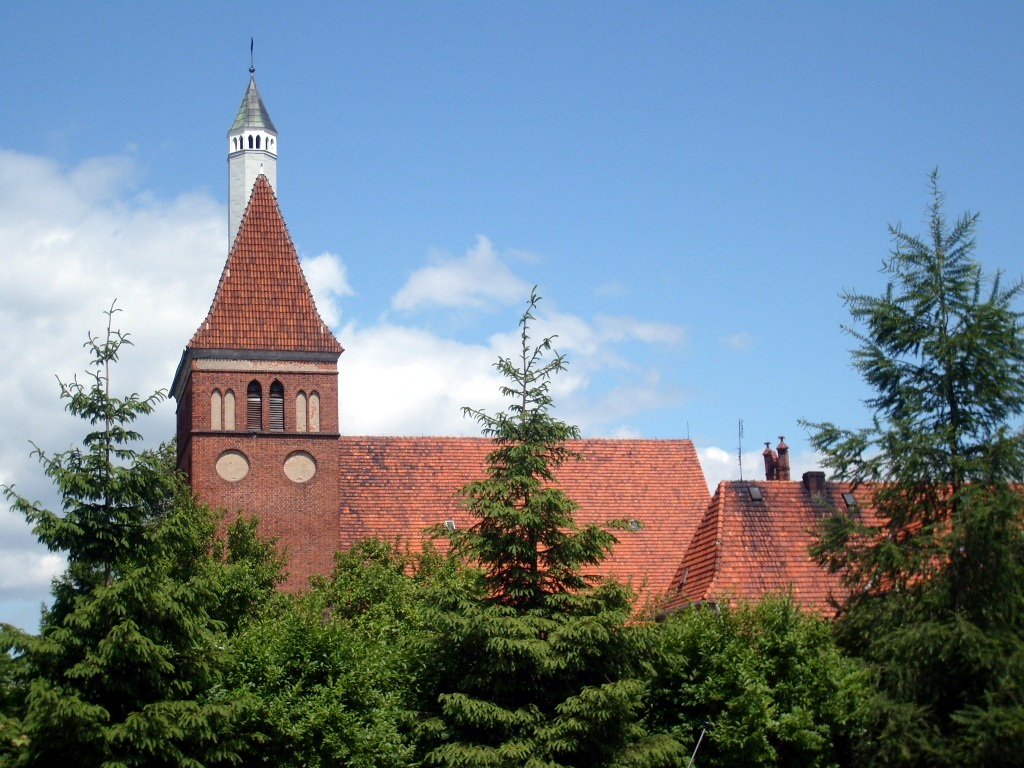
Christ the King Church

The oldest known mention of the settlement comes from a document issued by Duke Konrad I of Masovia of the Polish Piast dynasty in 1222.

Following the joint German-Soviet invasion of Poland, which started World War II in September 1939, the town was invaded and then occupied by Germany until 1945. Jabłonowo Pomorskie was one of the sites of executions of Poles carried out by Germany in 1939 as part of the Intelligenzaktion. The Polish resistance was active in the town. The Military Organization Lizard Union conducted espionage of German activity in the town.

== Sports ==
The local football club is Naprzód Jabłonowo. It competes in the lower leagues.
