= Nowa Wieś, Brodnica County =

Nowa Wieś
- Village
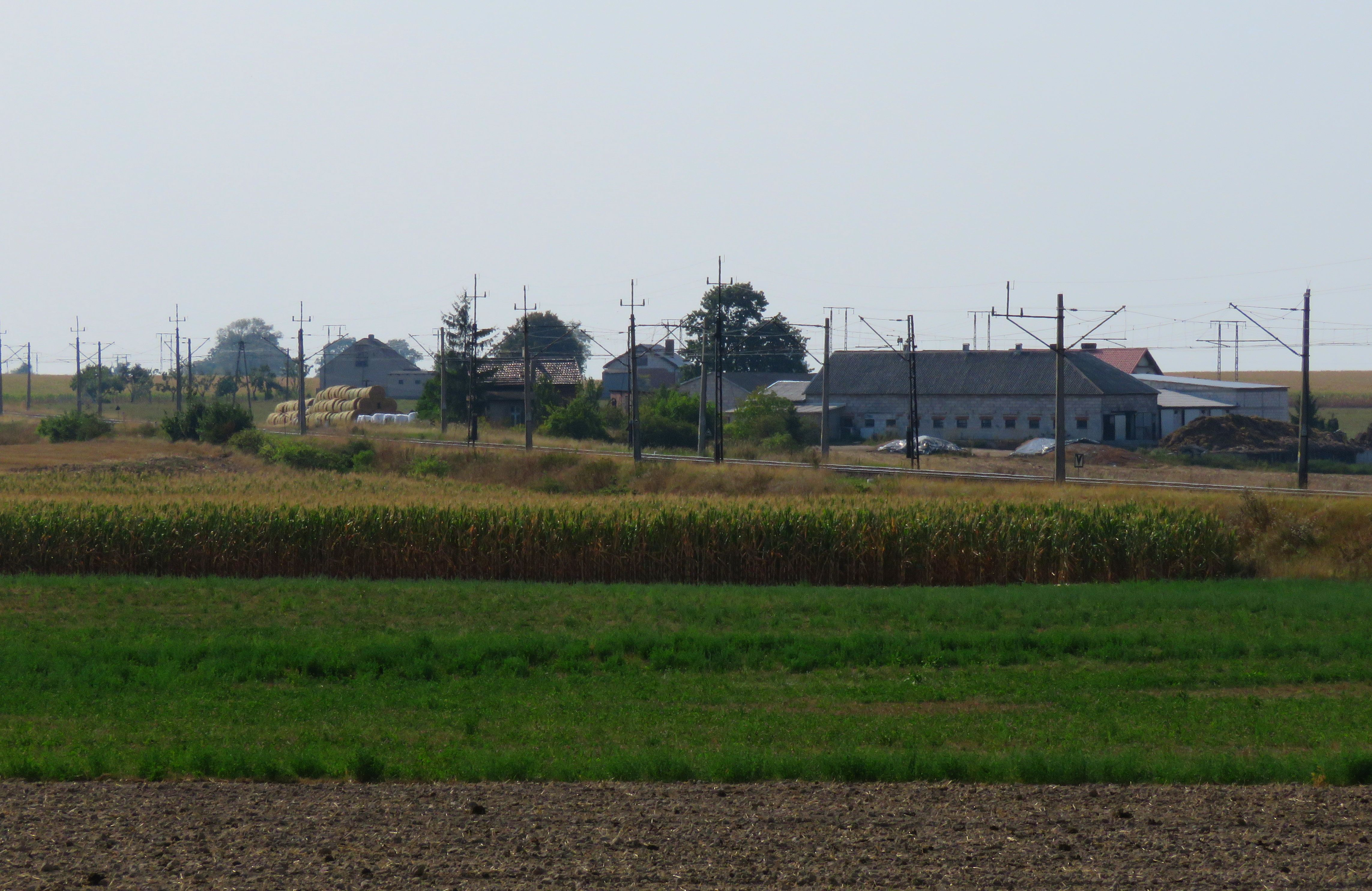

- Location within Poland
- Coordinates: 53°25′40″N 19°11′49″E
- Country: Poland
- Voivodeship: Kuyavian-Pomeranian
- County: Brodnica
- Gmina: Jabłonowo Pomorskie

Nowa Wieś [ˈnɔva ˈvjɛɕ] is a village in the administrative district of Gmina Jabłonowo Pomorskie, within Brodnica County, Kuyavian-Pomeranian Voivodeship, in north-central Poland.
