= Kamień, Kuyavian-Pomeranian Voivodeship =

Kamień
- Village
- Location within Poland
- Coordinates: 53°22′9″N 19°11′12″E
- Country: Poland
- Voivodeship: Kuyavian-Pomeranian
- County: Brodnica
- Gmina: Jabłonowo Pomorskie

Kamień (Polish pronunciation: [ˈkamjɛj̃]) is a village in the administrative district of Gmina Jabłonowo Pomorskie, within Brodnica County, Kuyavian-Pomeranian Voivodeship, in north-central Poland.
