= Budziszewo, Kuyavian-Pomeranian Voivodeship =

Budziszewo
- Village
- Location within Poland
- Coordinates: 53°21′54″N 19°6′24″E
- Country: Poland
- Voivodeship: Kuyavian-Pomeranian
- County: Brodnica
- Gmina: Jabłonowo Pomorskie

Budziszewo [bud͡ʑiˈʂɛvɔ] is a village in the administrative district of Gmina Jabłonowo Pomorskie, within Brodnica County, Kuyavian-Pomeranian Voivodeship, in north-central Poland.
