= Old Buck =

Old Buck may refer to:

- Nickname of James Buchanan (1791–1868), fifteenth president of the United States
- Nickname of Robert C. Buchanan (1811–1878), Union Army general during the American Civil War
- A Finnish malt whisky made by Panimoravintola Beer Hunter's
- Old Buck, a horse owned by Abraham Lincoln when he was a lawyer in Springfield, Illinois; see Old Bob, Old Buck's replacement

== See also ==
- Bedfordshire and Hertfordshire Regiment, a former British Army unit nicknamed "The Old Bucks"
- Buck (nickname)
- Histoire de Mr. Vieux Bois, a 19th-century work published in English as The Adventures of Mr. Obadiah Oldbuck, sometimes referred to simply as Oldbuck
