= Konojady =

- Village
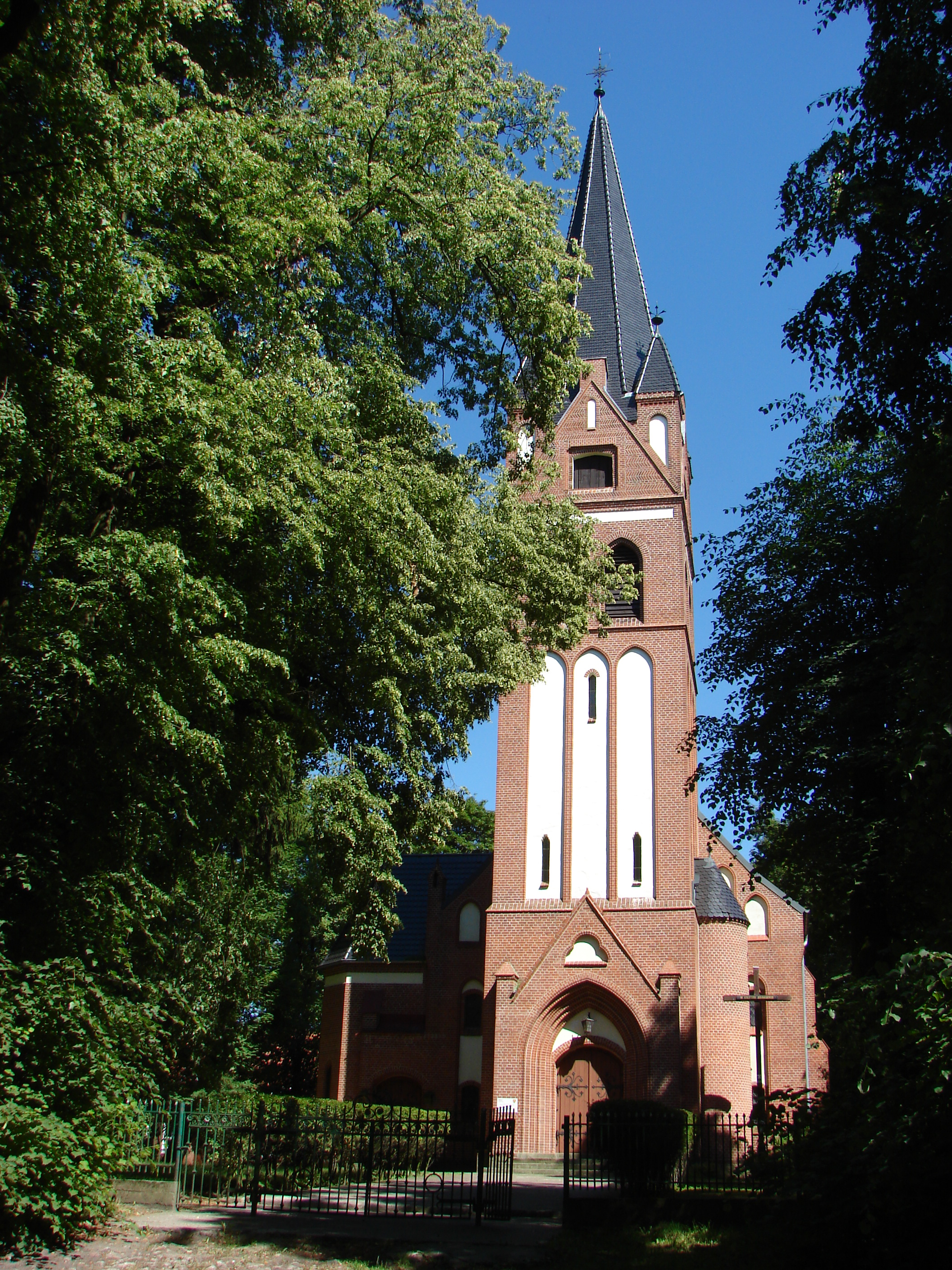
- Parish church, late 19th century.

- Location within Poland
- Coordinates: 53°21′N 19°13′E
- Country: Poland
- Voivodeship: Kuyavian-Pomeranian
- County: Brodnica
- Gmina: Jabłonowo Pomorskie

Population (approx.)
  - Total: 660
- Time zone: UTC+1 (CET)
  - Summer (DST): UTC+2 (CEST)
- Vehicle registration: CBR

Konojady [kɔnɔˈjadɨ] is a village in the administrative district of Gmina Jabłonowo Pomorskie, within Brodnica County, Kuyavian-Pomeranian Voivodeship, in north-central Poland.

Four Polish citizens were murdered by Nazi Germany in the village during World War II.

== Notable residents ==
- Gero Bisanz (1935–2014), German football coach
