= Piecewo, Kuyavian-Pomeranian Voivodeship =

Piecewo
- Village
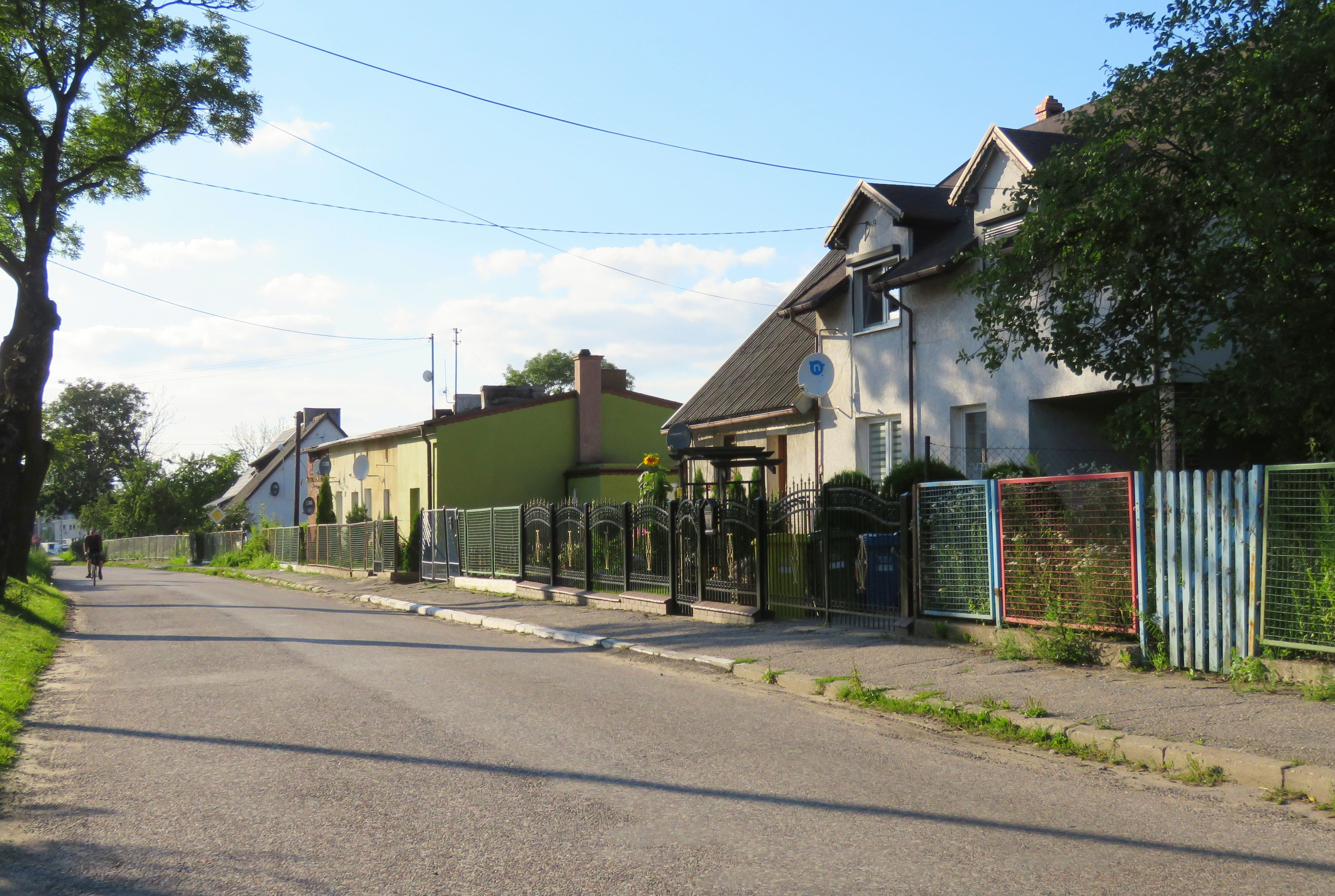

- Location within Poland
- Coordinates: 53°22′31″N 19°08′09″E
- Country: Poland
- Voivodeship: Kuyavian-Pomeranian
- County: Brodnica
- Gmina: Jabłonowo Pomorskie

Piecewo [pjɛˈt͡sɛvɔ] is a village in the administrative district of Gmina Jabłonowo Pomorskie, within Brodnica County, Kuyavian-Pomeranian Voivodeship, in north-central Poland.
