= Szczepanki, Brodnica County =

Szczepanki
- Village
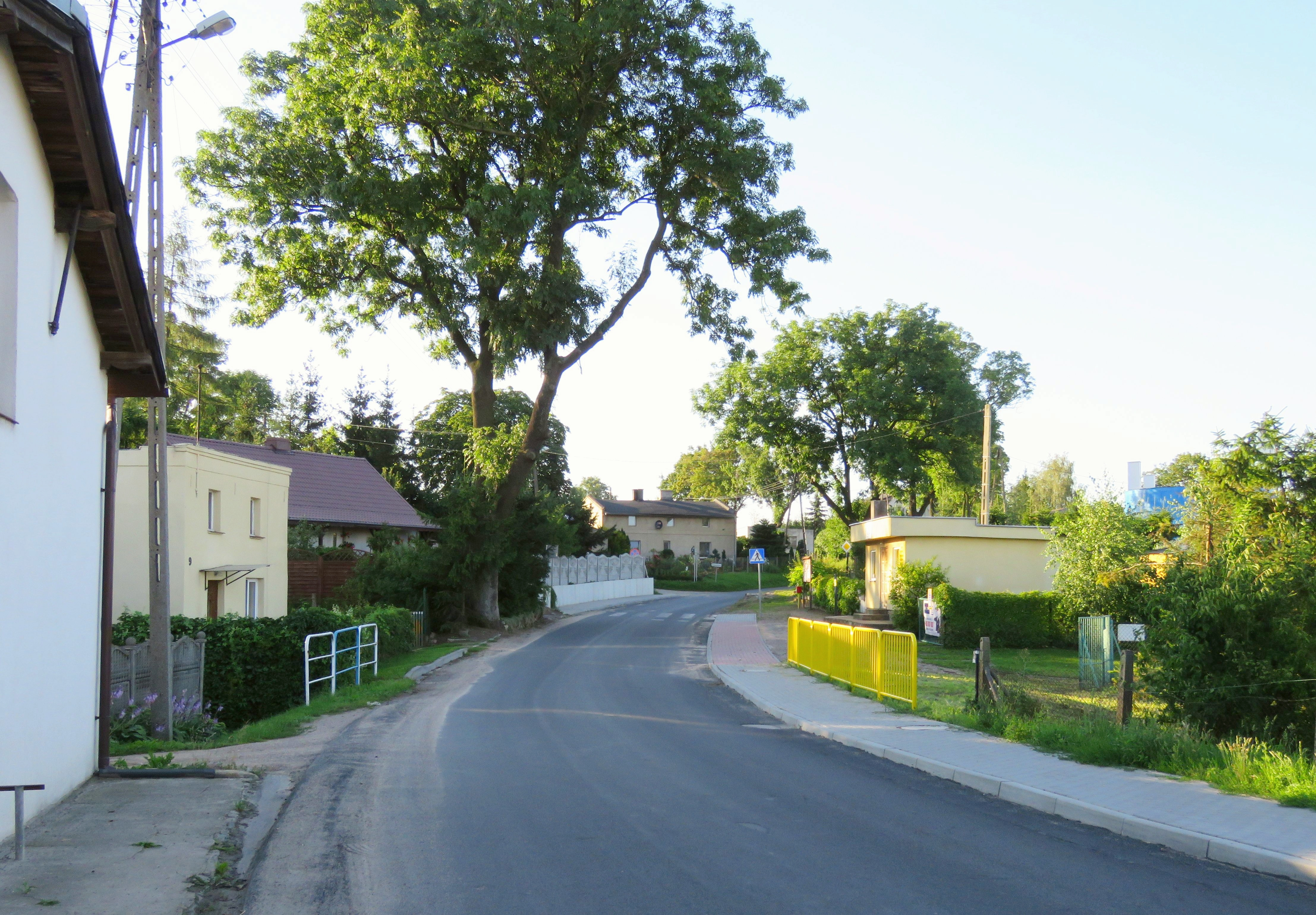

- Location within Poland
- Coordinates: 53°23′59″N 19°08′51″E
- Country: Poland
- Voivodeship: Kuyavian-Pomeranian
- County: Brodnica
- Gmina: Jabłonowo Pomorskie

Szczepanki [ʂt͡ʂɛˈpaŋki] is a village in the administrative district of Gmina Jabłonowo Pomorskie, within Brodnica County, Kuyavian-Pomeranian Voivodeship, in north-central Poland.
