= Buck (crater) =

Crater on Venus

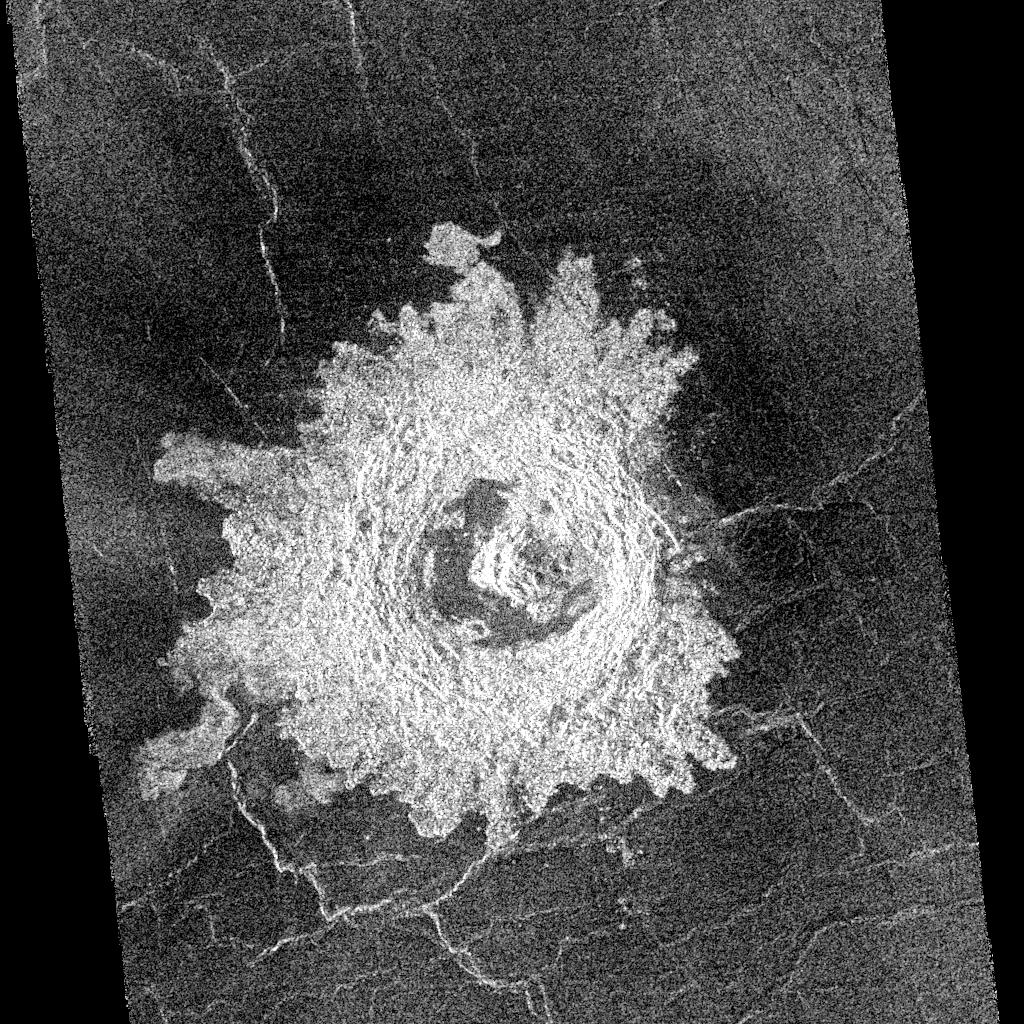
- Radar image of Buck by Magellan
- Location: Venus
- Coordinates: 5.75°S 349.6°E
- Diameter: 21.8 km
- Eponym: Pearl S. Buck

Buck is a crater in the Navka region of Venus. It has the terraced walls, flat radar-dark floor, and central peak that are characteristic of craters classified as "complex". The central peak on its floor is unusually large. Flow-like deposits extend beyond the limits of the coarser rim deposits on its west and southwest. Like about half of the craters mapped by Magellan to date, it is surrounded by a local, radar-dark halo.
