= Buk (Přerov District) =

- Municipality
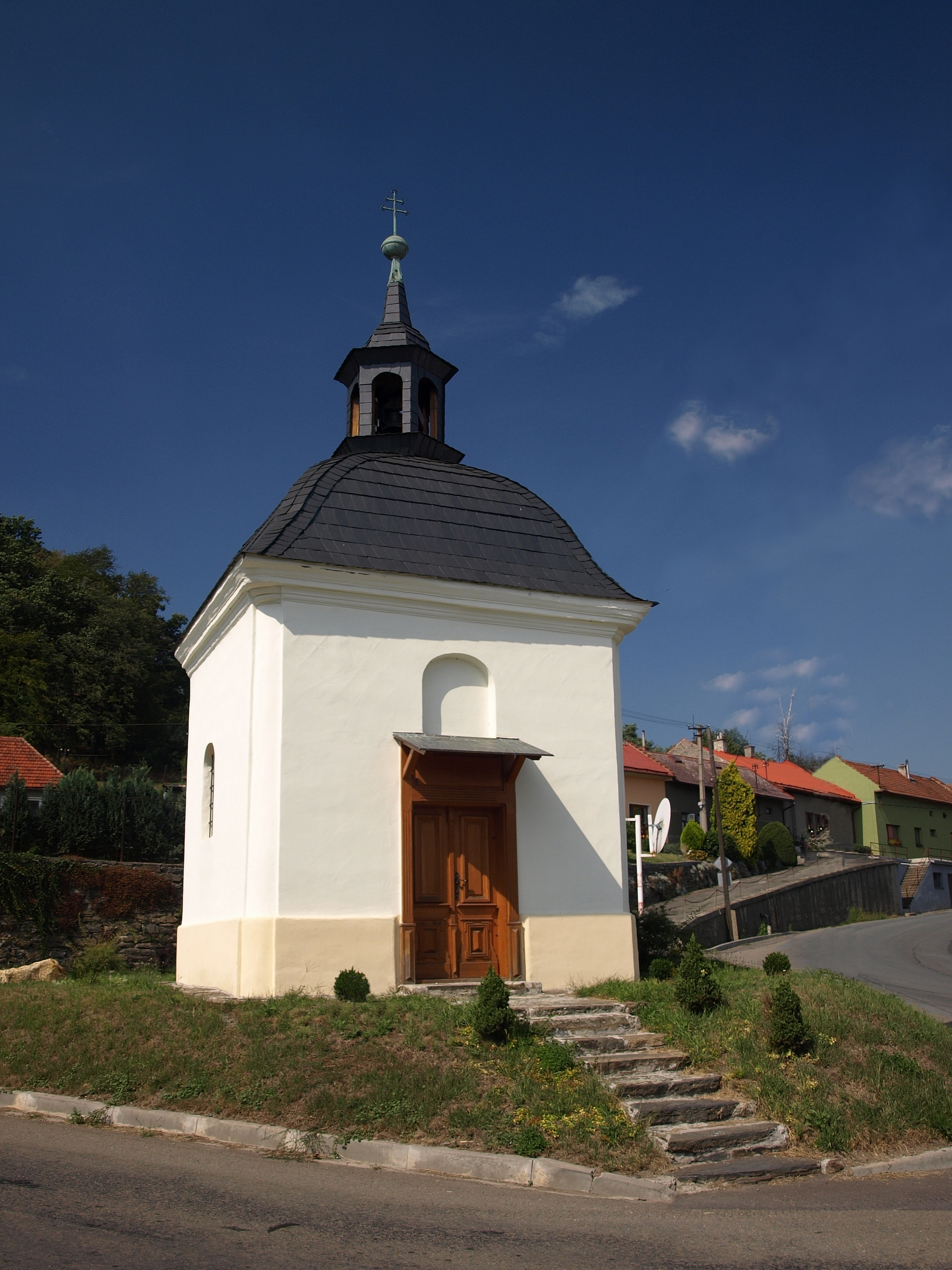
- Chapel of Saint Urban

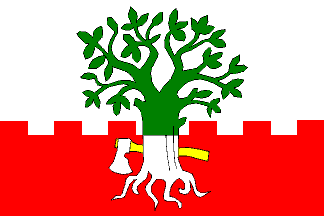
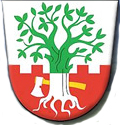
- Flag Coat of arms

- Location in the Czech Republic
- Coordinates: 49°30′16″N 17°28′7″E
- Country: Czech Republic
- Region: Olomouc
- District: Přerov
- First mentioned: 1275

Area
  - Total: 3.78 km^{2} (1.46 sq mi)
- Elevation: 250 m (820 ft)

Population (2026-01-01)
  - Total: 385
  - Density: 102/km^{2} (264/sq mi)
- Time zone: UTC+1 (CET)
  - Summer (DST): UTC+2 (CEST)
- Postal code: 751 21
- Website: www.obecbuk.eu

Buk is a municipality and village in Přerov District in the Olomouc Region of the Czech Republic. It has about 400 inhabitants.

Buk lies approximately 6 kilometres (4 mi) north of Přerov, 19 km (12 mi) south-east of Olomouc, and 229 km (142 mi) east of Prague.

== Demographics ==
Historical population
Year	Pop.	±%
1869	311	—
1880	363	+16.7%
1890	404	+11.3%
1900	401	−0.7%
1910	469	+17.0%
1921	508	+8.3%
1930	561	+10.4%
1950	487	−13.2%
1961	509	+4.5%
1970	436	−14.3%
1980	426	−2.3%
1991	371	−12.9%
2001	373	+0.5%
2011	343	−8.0%
2021	364	+6.1%
Source: Censuses
