= Bryagovets =

Bryagovets Бряговец
- Village
- Location within Bulgaria
- Coordinates: 41.6500°N 25.8000°E
- Country: Bulgaria
- Province: Kardzhali Province
- Municipality: Krumovgrad
- Elevation: 267 m (876 ft)
- Time zone: UTC+2 (EET)
  - Summer (DST): UTC+3 (EEST)

Bryagovets is a village in Krumovgrad Municipality, Kardzhali Province, southern Bulgaria.

== Landmarks ==
Located nearby is the medieval rock monastery known as "Reverend Martin’s Hole" and holds national cultural significance. Local legends suggest that Reverend Martin used this site as a hideout during the Ottoman era, where he would ambush and rob wealthy people.

About 6 km southwest of Bryagovets, where the Arda River flows into the Krumovitza River, lies a valley approximately 1,000 meters wide. On the cliff called Kovan Kaya, near the Oreshari protected area, there are over 150 carved rock niches. These niches, grouped in several locations, are associated with various Thracian archaeological sites in the region.

The Ivaylovgrad dam, situated 27 km to the east of Bryagovets, is one of the largest dams in Bulgaria. The dam supports a variety of fish species, including catfish, carp, and zander, making it a popular spot for fishing. Additionally, the dam is used for water sports, hosting the Republican canoeing regatta every June.
