= USS Buck =

USS Buck has been the name of more than one United States Navy ship, and may refer to:

- USS Buck (SP-1355), a ship's tender in commission from 1917 to 1918
- USS Buck (DD-420), a destroyer commissioned in 1939 and sunk in 1943
- USS Buck (DD-761), a destroyer in commission from 1946 to 1973
