= Buk Pomorski =

- Village
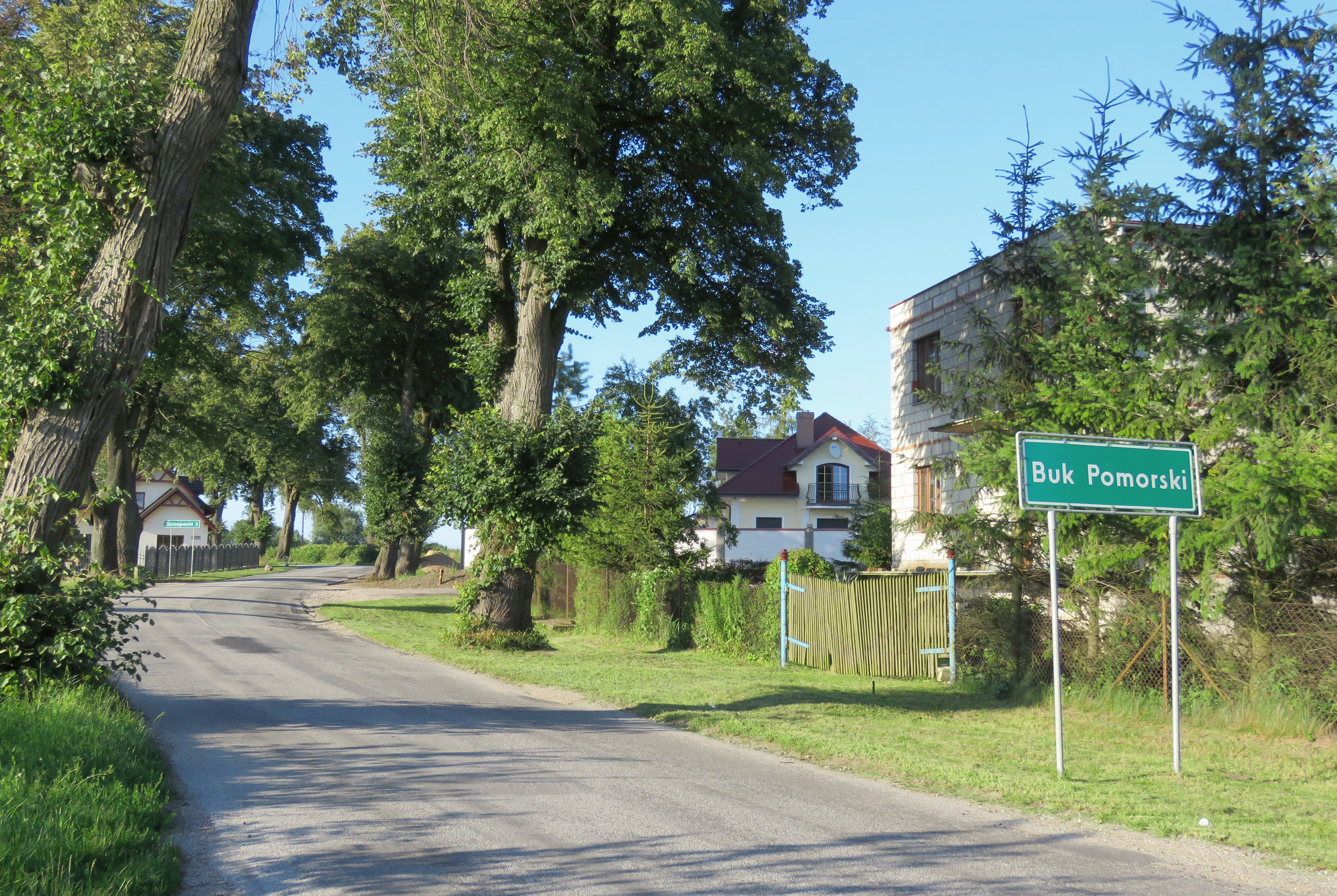

- Location within Poland
- Coordinates: 53°25′27″N 19°10′7″E
- Country: Poland
- Voivodeship: Kuyavian-Pomeranian
- County: Brodnica
- Gmina: Jabłonowo Pomorskie

Buk Pomorski [ˈbuk pɔˈmɔrski] is a village in the administrative district of Gmina Jabłonowo Pomorskie, within Brodnica County, Kuyavian-Pomeranian Voivodeship, in north-central Poland.
