= Bucky =

Bucky may refer to:

== People ==
=== Nickname ===
==== Arts and media ====
- William Bucky Baxter (1955–2020), American multi-instrumentalist from New Jersey
- William Bucky Covington (born 1977), American country music singer
- Richard Buckminster Fuller (1895–1983), American architect, author, designer and inventor
- Clark Bucky Halker (born 1954), American academic, music historian, labor activist, singer and songwriter
- John Bucky Pizzarelli (1926–2020), American jazz guitarist

==== Sports ====
===== American football =====
- Ernest Bucky Curtis Jr. (c. 1929–2019), player for Vanderbilt University
- Temuchin Bucky Hodges (born 1995), tight end for the New York Jets
- William Bucky Moore (1905-1980), American National Football League player
- Frank Bucky Pope (born 1941), American former National Football League player
- William Bucky Scribner (1960–2017), American punter

===== Baseball =====
- Darrell Bucky Brandon (born 1940), American former Major League Baseball player
- Russell Bucky Dent (born 1951), American former Major League Baseball player
- Stanley Bucky Harris (1896–1977), American Major League Baseball player, manager, and executive
- Newton Bucky Jacobs (1913–1990), American Major League Baseball pitcher
- Larry Bucky Jacobsen (born 1975), American former Major League Baseball player
- Harris McGalliard (1908–1978), better known as Bucky Harris, American professional baseball player
- Frederick Bucky Veil (1881–1931), Major League Baseball player
- Wallace Bucky Williams (1906–2009), Negro league baseball player

===== Basketball =====
- Arlen Bucky Bockhorn (born 1933), retired American basketball player
- Morris Bucky Buckwalter (born 1933), American former National Basketball Association coach and executive
- Paul Bucky McConnell (1928–2019), American former professional basketball player
- Frank Bucky O'Connor (1913–1958), college men's basketball coach
- Raymond Bucky Waters (born 1935), American basketball broadcaster

===== Other sports =====
- Gordon Bucky Hollingworth (1933–1974), Canadian ice hockey defenceman
- Charles Bucky Lasek (born 1972), American professional skateboarder and rallycross driver

==== Other fields ====
- Richard Buckminster Fuller (1895–1983), American architect, author, designer and inventor
- Clark Bucky Halker (born 1954), American academic, music historian, labor activist, singer and songwriter
- William McCullough (loyalist) (1949–1981), Northern Irish paramilitary
- Ralph "Bucky" Phillips (born 1962), American convicted murderer

=== Surname ===
- Gustav Peter Bucky (1880–1963), German-American radiologist who made early contributions to X-ray technique

== Fictional characters ==
- Bucky (Marvel Comics), several fictional characters in the Marvel Comics universe
- Bucky, a squirrel from The Emperor's New Groove franchise
- Bucky, the ship from the show Jake and the Never Land Pirates
- Bucky, the protagonist of the manga Jibaku-kun
- Bucky Buenaventura, from The Zeta Project
- Bucky Katt, from the comic strip Get Fuzzy
- Bucky McBadBat, on the television show The Fairly OddParents
- Bucky O'Hare, comic book and television show character

== Mascots ==
- Bucky Badger, the official mascot of the University of Wisconsin–Madison
- Bucky (mascot), the mascot of the East Tennessee State Buccaneers

== Other uses ==
- Bucky (Tyrannosaurus rex), a dinosaur specimen
- Buckfast Tonic Wine, a wine made in England, nicknamed "Bucky"
- Part of an X-ray generator that holds film

== See also ==
- Buckey (disambiguation)
- Buckie, a town in Scotland
- Buckie (disambiguation)
- Bucky bit, a type of bit in computing
- Buc-ee's, a convenience store
