= Bucky Halker =

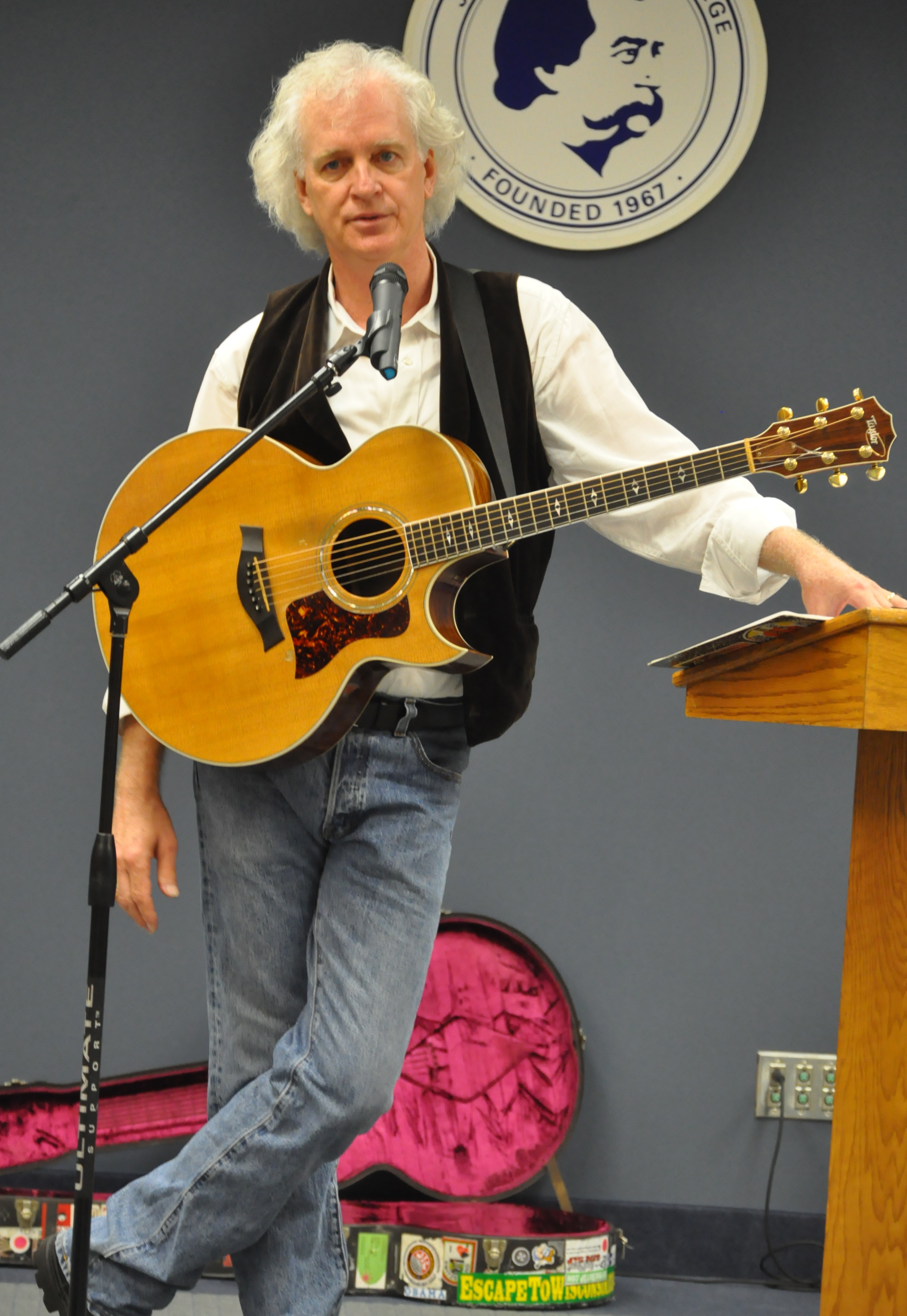

Background information
- Born: Clark D. Halker; 1954 (age 71–72); Beaver Dam, Wisconsin, United States
- Genres: Americana, American folk, labor protest
- Occupations: Singer; songwriter; music historian; labor activist
- Years active: 1984–present
- Labels: Revolting Records, Brambus Records
- Website: www.buckyhalker.com

Clark "Bucky" Halker (born 1954) is an American academic, music historian, labor activist, singer and songwriter who specializes in American folk music. Halker is best known for his work on labor protest songs, Illinois folk music, and his involvement with the preservation of Woody Guthrie's musical legacy. He is a recipient of the American Folklife Center's Archie Green Fellowship.

== Early life ==
Halker was born in Beaver Dam, WI, and grew up in Ashland, WI, where he began performing in rock bands and as a solo artist as a teenager. He attended The College of Idaho, majoring in History. Later, he enrolled in graduate school at the University of Minnesota, and continued his studies in History focusing on the working class and labor protest songs and poetry. After completing an MA and PhD at the university, he taught at the College of Idaho, Albion College, and North Central College. In 1986, moved to Chicago, IL, and began working as a freelance scholar and musician.

== Career ==
Halker released his debut album, A Sense of Place in 1984, with Step n' Blue, a collection of blues and folk songs, released shortly after in 1986. He joined the Chicago band The Remainders as frontman, and released a single record with them in 1993. Human Geography followed in 1993, and Passion, Politics, Love being released in 1997 to acclaim, with Erik Hague from AllMusic calling it "top-notch, varied Americana". 2001 saw the release of Don't Want Your Millions, partly funded by the Illinois Arts Council, and considered a historic document of union and labor songs, featuring material from Studs Terkel, The Carter Family, Hazel Dickens and Lead Belly.

In 1991, Halker authored the book For Democracy, Workers, and God: Labor Song-Poems and Labor Protest, 1865-1895, accompanied by a cassette of labor protest songs.

As part of his ongoing work with folk music, Halker has also produced the Illinois Humanities Council's Folksongs of Illinois series volumes 1-5, which chronicles the history of folk music in Illinois since 1865. Volume 4, Chicago Since 1945, was released in 2011 through a grant from the Illinois Arts Council. A National Endowment of the Arts grant funded Volume 5 of the series, Chicago Since 1970, which was released in 2013. In 2015, Bucky released Anywhere But Utah: Songs of Joe Hill, a tribute CD in honor of Joe Hill, an IWW activist, who was executed (for a murder he likely did not commit) by firing squad in Salt Lake City, Utah, November 19, 1915. The year 2015 marks the 100th anniversary of Hill's execution. The CD contains songs all written by Hill, some of which have never been recorded. Funding for the project was provided by the Illinois Arts Council Agency and the Swedish Council of America.

=== Woody Guthrie ===
For years, Halker has been involved in the promotion and preservation of Woody Guthrie's musical legacy through concerts, lectures, writings, and media programs. In 2012, Halker released The Ghost of Woody Guthrie in collaboration with Minneapolis musician Andy Dee. The album is a tribute to Guthrie and includes eighteen Halker originals songs and four Guthrie songs. On volume 4 of the Folksongs of Illinois CD series Halker included Old Chy-Car-Go, a Guthrie song that was part of the performer's repertoire but had not been recorded before 2010. Halker recorded the song in collaboration with Cathy Richardson.

Bucky Halker also served on the board of the Woody Guthrie Foundation and Archives until it disbanded in 2014. As part of Guthrie's birth centennial in 2012, Halker participated in several memorial concerts that showcased the singer's material.

== Personal life ==
Halker is married and lives with his wife in Chicago, Illinois.
