= Buk Góralski =

- Village
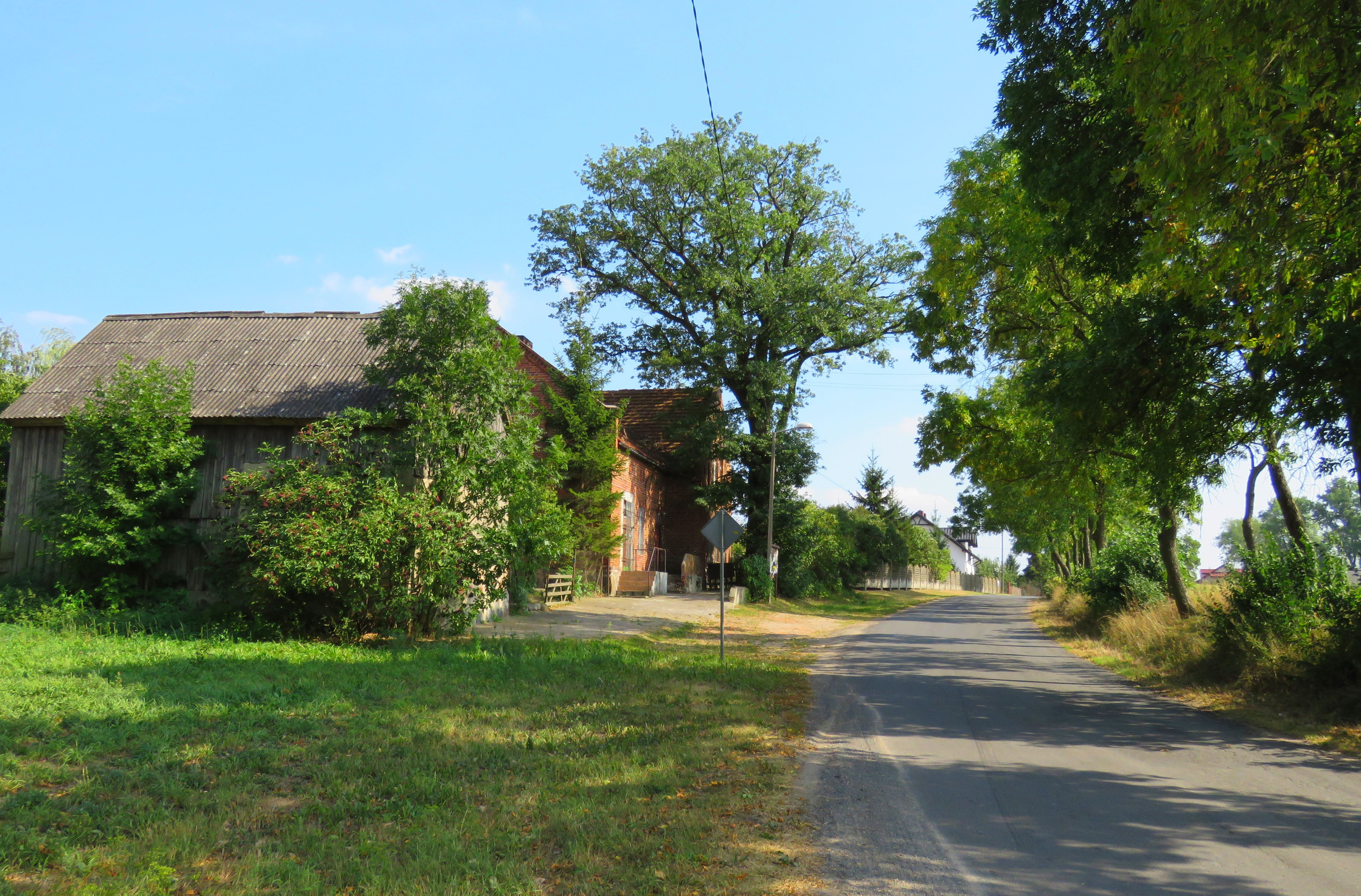

- Location within Poland
- Coordinates: 53°23′50″N 19°13′35″E
- Country: Poland
- Voivodeship: Kuyavian-Pomeranian
- County: Brodnica
- Gmina: Jabłonowo Pomorskie

Buk Góralski [ˈbuk ɡuˈralski] is a village in the administrative district of Gmina Jabłonowo Pomorskie, within Brodnica County, Kuyavian-Pomeranian Voivodeship, in north-central Poland.

== Massacre during Second World War ==
During the German Invasion of Poland in 1939, German forces on 21 September together with Selbstschutz murdered 12 people in the village.
