= Xinca =

Xinca may refer to:

- Xinca people — an Indigenous people in southern Guatemala
- Xincan languages — their Indigenous Mesoamerican languages

Xinka refers to:

- Xinka, Somalia, a town in the Uur Caleed area of Somalia

== See also ==
- Shinca (disambiguation)
- Shinka (disambiguation)
- Chinka (disambiguation)
