= Shinka (disambiguation) =

Shinka may refer to:

- Shinka, a village in Pakistan
- Mazda RX-8 Shinka, a special edition in the North American market

== See also ==
- Kani Shinka, a village in Iran
- Shinka-ron, a DVD box-set from Akinori Nakagawa
- Shinca (disambiguation)
- Chinka (disambiguation)
