= Yumiko Takahashi =

Japanese actress and singer (born 1974)

- 高橋 由美子
- Born: 7 January 1974 (age 52); Ōmiya-ku (formerly Ōmiya), Saitama, Saitama, Japan
- Occupations: Actress; singer
- Years active: 1988–present
- Notable work: Stage; Annie Yo jū o Tore; Mozart!; Les Misérables; Miss Saigon; Shiroh; CD; Step by Step; Fight!; Good Love; Tomodachide īkara
- Television: Minami-kun no Koibito; Shomuni; Kayō Suspense Gekijō: Karuizawa Mystery
- Height: 154 cm (5 ft 1 in)
- Website: Official profile

Yumiko Takahashi (高橋 由美子, Takahashi Yumiko; born 7 January 1974, in Ōmiya-ku (formerly Ōmiya), Saitama, Saitama) is a Japanese actress and singer. She is nicknamed "Good-P" short for Good Personality. She has had prominent roles in a number of television series, feature films and stage productions. As a singer she has released ten albums. Following the prominence of idols such as Momoe Yamaguchi in the 1970s, and Seiko Matsuda, Akina Nakamori, Kyoko Koizumi, and Yoko Minamino in the 1980s, the 1990s was characterized as the "Idol Winter" due to a decline in the genre's popularity. During this period, the media referred to Takahashi as "the last orthodox idol of the 20th century."

She has been represented with several agencies, including Big Apple, Hirata Office, (Note: Because Big Apple was absorbed with that agency.) Toho Entertainment, and Konni.

== Discography ==
Those not listed in the publisher is released from Victor Entertainment (formerly Victor music industry).

=== Singles ===
| Date | Title | Notes |
|---|---|---|
| 21 Apr 1990 | Step by Step/Kimi ni Tomaranai – My Girl, My Life | NTV anime Mashin Hero Wataru 2 theme song |
| 21 Sep 1990 | Fight!/Niji no Kanatani | NTV anime Mashin Hero Wataru 2: Super Fighting Story theme song |
| 21 Jan 1991 | Egao no Mahō/Kaze no Oka | |
| 5 Jun 1991 | To-ki-me-ki/Alps no Shōjo | Cover of the same masterpiece of Megumi Asaoka, a girl in the Alps of Coupling also a cover of Asaoka |
| 16 Oct 1991 | Genki! Genki! Genki!/Suki nante Ienai kurai | Game software Sega CD Yumimi Mix ending theme |
| 5 Feb 1992 | Itsuka Aou ne/Ano Ni kara Boku wa | |
| 3 Jun 1992 | Côte d'Azur de Aimashou/Taiyō no Ballerina | Garfield image song broadcasting at Wowow |
| 21 Oct 1992 | Achichitchi -fire version-/Konnani soba ni Iru | Another version of the songs included in the album paradise; Sega CD software game Yumimi Mix opening Theme |
| 16 Dec 1992 | Daisuki/Futari no Symphony | Theatre version Chibi Maruko-chan: My Favorite Song theme song |
| 24 Feb 1993 | Good Love/My Melodies | CX drama Onegai Darling! theme song |
| 23 Jun 1993 | Hajimari wa Ima/Deaerutteīne | NTV Ultra Seven O'Clock opening theme |
| 3 Nov 1993 | yell/Anata dake o | NTV drama Mōhitotsu no J-League insert song |
| 21 Jan 1994 | Tomodachide īkara/Kondo Deaeru Tokiniha | EX drama Minami-kun no Koibito theme song |
| 21 Apr 1994 | Good-bye Tears/Point 1 | TX anime Haō Taikei Ryū Knight theme song |
| 22 Jun 1994 | Sonna no Muri!/Omoide agenai | NHK E Soriton: Kin no Ono Gin no Ono image song |
| 21 Oct 1994 | 3-Nen Sugita Koro ni wa/Jikan o Tomete | |
| 24 May 1995 | Suki... Demo Suki/Aisazu ni Irarenai | EX drama Saikō no Koibito theme song |
| 22 Nov 1995 | Saijōkyū I like you/Nani mo Ienakute | |
| 3 Mar 1996 | Makete mo ī yo/Hitori kiri no Yoake | CX drama Īhitabidachi: 4tsu no Sotsugyō ending theme |
| 24 Jul 1996 | Will You Marry Me?/Chottomatte chōdai, keda mono-san | TBS series Sekai Ulrun Taizai-ki Ending Theme |
| 22 Jan 1997 | Ima made donna Koi o shite kita 'ndarou/Dōni kashite! | EX drama Nagare Itashichinin insert song |
| 22 Oct 1997 | Waratteru dake janai/Cotton Time | NTV series Mogmog Gombo ending theme |
| 23 Jul 1998 | Futari no Kyori/Okujō | |
| 24 Feb 1999 | Rasen no Tsuki/Restart | Virtually her last single |

=== Albums ===
- Original albums

| Date | Title | No. | Notes |
|---|---|---|---|
| 16 Dec 1990 | Scarlet | VICL-2045 | The first edition came with a mini photo book |
| 21 Jul 1991 | Peace! | VICL-174 | In the first edition, colour photograph (person's face picture) disc label |
| 4 Mar 1992 | dream | VICL-275 | |
| 22 Jul 1992 | Paradise | VICL-323 | |
| 24 Mar 1993 | Reality | VICL-386 | |
| 21 Jul 1993 | Prelude | VICL-427 | |
| 21 Jul 1994 | Tenderly | VICL-551 | |
| 23 Nov 1994 | Working on Xmas Day | VICL-23075 | Limited Edition |
| 7 Aug 1996 | Everything is Fine | VICL-797 | |
| 21 Nov 1997 | Kibun Jōjō | VICL-60153 | |

- Best albums

| Date | Title | No. | Notes | Ref. |
|---|---|---|---|---|
| 16 Dec 1993 | Steps -Single Collection- | VIZL-15 | First Press CD Book Package | |
| 16 Dec 1993 | Steps -Single Collection- | VICL-491 | Normal Edition | |
| 21 Jun 1995 | for Boys | VICL-5278 | Selection by male staff | |
| 21 Jun 1995 | for Girls | VICL-5279 | Selection by female staff | |
| 22 Sep 2004 | Steps -Single Collection- | VICL-41114 | Recurring machine | |
| 16 Sep 2009 | Golden Best | VICL-63455 | Re-released 18 Aug 2010 | |
| 29 Sep 2010 | Complete Single Collection "The Steps" 20th Anniversary Special Edition | VIZL-393 | 5 discs (4 CDs + 1 DVD) | |
| 22 Apr 2015 | Golden Best | VICL-70164 | SHM re-released | |
| 20 Sep 2015 | Deluxe Pack 25th Anniversary Special | VIZL-869 | 2 CDs + Photo Album | |

=== Omnibus ===
| Year | Title | Label |
|---|---|---|
| 2006 | Hi Kōnin! Seikima II Cover Album Voice | BMG Japan |

=== Musical Recordings ===
| Year | Title | Production | Role | Notes |
|---|---|---|---|---|
| 2002 | Mozart! | Toho | Nannerl Mozart | Japan premiere live recording board; Yoshio Inoue edition, Akinori Nakagawa version end of sale end (out of print) |
| 2003 | Les Misérables | Toho | Fantine | Performance casting in 2003; participated in Toho E-0308Y (Yuichiro Yamaguchi (Orange) version) and Toho E-308B (Tetsuya Bessho (Green) version), while 4 patterns were released |
| 2005 | Mozart! | Toho | Nannerl Mozart | Highlight Studio Recording CD |
| 2006 | Golf The Musical | Parco Theater | Ruri Itoman | Live CD |

=== Other already released song recording board ===
==== Soundtracks ====
| Date | Title | No. | Songs |
|---|---|---|---|
| 16 Dec 1992 | Chibi Maruko-chan –My Favorite Song: Original Soundtrack | MVCD-10001 | "Daisuki" |
| 24 Mar 1993 | Oshare Kozō wa Hana 'maru': Original Soundtrack | VICL-382 | "Hare nochi Kumori no chi Hare" |
| 7 Jun 1995 | Saikō no Koibito: Original Soundtrack | | "Suki... Demo suki (drama version)", "Suki... Demo suki (Instrumental)" |

==== Mashin Hero Wataru series ====
| Date | Title | Notes |
|---|---|---|
| 21 Jun 1990 | Mashin Hero Wataru 2: Ongaku-hen I | "Step by Step", "Kimi ni Tomaranai –My Girl, My Love–" |
| 21 Nov 1990 | Mashin Hero Wataru 2: Chō Gekitō-hen Ongaku-hen I | "Fight!", "Niji no kanata ni" |
| 21 Mar 1991 | Mashin Hero Wataru 2: Sotsugyō Kinen Best Album: Vocal Collection | Four songs |
| 3 Dec 1997 | Mashin Hero Wataru Single Collection -1988 May–1993 Sept.- | Four songs |
| 24 Sep 2014 | Mashin Hero Wataru CD-Box Vocal Complete Collection | VTZL-78; four songs; new interview posting |
| 25 Sep 2020 | Mashin Hero Wataru 2: Music Collection | Four songs |

==== Haō Taikei Ryū Knight series ====
| Date | Title | Songs |
|---|---|---|
| 21 Jul 1994 | Haō Taikei Ryū Knight: CD Cinema 1 "Bravo Toride no Kettō" | "Good-bye Tears (short version)" |
| 24 Aug 1995 | Haō Taikei Ryū Knight: Original Soundtrack 1 | "Good-bye Tears", "Good-bye Tears (Instrumental)" |
| 23 Nov 1995 | Haō Taikei Ryū Knight: Adeu Legend Original Soundtrack 1 | "Good-bye Tears", "Point 1 (Instrumental)" |
| 3 Apr 1996 | Haō Taikei Ryū Knight: Vocal Collection | "Good-bye Tears", "Point 1" |

==== Compilations ====
| Date | Title | No. | Songs |
|---|---|---|---|
| 21 Jul 1991 | I Love "Dance Number" 'July, 1991' | | "To-ki-me-ki", "Egao no Mahō" |
| 24 Feb 1993 | Eiga mitaina Koi shitai -Love me like a Movie- | | "Daisuki" |
| 30 Nov 1994 | '94 Anime Shudaika Collection | | "Good-bye Tears" |
| 12 Jul 1995 | Saishin Anime Shudaika-shū | | "Good-bye Tears" |
| 16 Nov 1995 | Saishin Anime Shudaika-shū: TV-Radio-hen | | "Good-bye Tears" |
| 22 Nov 1995 | Ladies' Pops Hit Collection | | "Suki... Demo suki" |
| 3 Nov 1999 | 20 Seiki Best Idol History Victor Entertainment-hen 1 | | "Fight!" |
| 3 Nov 1999 | 20 Seiki Best Idol History Victor Entertainment-hen 2 | | "Tomodachide īkara" |
| 21 Aug 2002 | Emotion 20 Shūnenkinen Theme Collection: TV-hen | | "Good-bye Tears" |
| 21 Aug 2002 | Emotion 20 Shūnenkinen Theme Collection: OVA & Gekijō-hen | | "Point 1" |
| 22 Sep 2005 | Anime Song Selection: Idol-hen | | "Step by Step" |
| 19 Dec 2007 | Debut! –Victor Idol Pops: Debut Single History– | | "Step by Step" |
| 21 May 2008 | Heroine! Aishi no Joyū Song Collection 1970 - 90s | | "Itsuka Aou ne" |
| 24 Sep 2008 | The Victor Recordings/Victor Recordings (7) 1988-1997 | VICL-62915 - 6 | "Tomodachide īkara" |
| 19 Sep 2012 | Idol! Idol! Aidoru! 80's-90's | | "Tomodachide īkara" |
| 21 Nov 2012 | Debut! –Victor Idol Pops: Debut Single History– (re-release) | | "Step by Step" |
| 26 Dec 2012 | Kyōhei Tsutsumi Golden History Nante ttatte Idol | VICL-63974 - 5 | "Genki! Genki! Genki!" |
| 19 Mar 2014 | Idol Pops Golden Age | VICL-41345 | "Tomodachide īkara" |

=== LD/VHS ===
| Date | Title | Notes |
|---|---|---|
| 27 Mar 1991 | Sweet Dressing | |
| 27 Sep 1991 | Promotion -Yumiko Takahashi First Live | LD version was recorded live audio track called "Kaizoku-ban" on Side-2 |
| 27 Mar 1992 | Wonderland | As the initial version, not only the VHS version but also the S-VHS version were sometimes released |
| 6 Nov 1992 | Yumiko Takahashi Concert '92 Natsuda! Yumiko da! Zenin Shūgō! | |
| 21 Apr 1993 | Profile | |
| 21 May 1993 | Aquarium | |
| 7 Dec 1994 | Yumiko Takahashi Concert Tenderly Tour '94 | At the same time a video CD version was also released |

(LD and VHS versions exist for all of the above works, and the DVD version was released on 19 November 2008)

| Date | Title | Publisher | Notes |
|---|---|---|---|
| 20 Apr 1992 | Minami no Shima ni Ikōyo | Adex | Person's image video, songs are not included; VHS version only |

== Bibliography ==
=== Essays ===
| Date | Title | Publisher | ISBN |
|---|---|---|---|
| Jan 1993 | Oshaberi Tenshi | Wani Books | ISBN 4847011716 |

=== Photo albums ===
| Date | Title | Photographer | Publisher | ISBN | Notes |
|---|---|---|---|---|---|
| 21 Jun 1991 | pure mint | Harushi Kimura | Victor Books | ISBN 4893890409 | Three sides back boxed |
| 1 Nov 1991 | Bomb! Momoco Tokubetsu Henshū Power Bomb Yumiko Takahashi Perfect Photo Book Shohan | | Gakken | ISBN 4056002479 | Belt is pink |
| 25 Jun 1992 | Blue | Harushi Kimura | Wani Books | | Three sides back boxed |
| 25 Jun 1993 | Il Dinja | Shinji Hosono | Gakken | ISBN 4056002479 | |
| 1 Apr 1994 | Il Dinja | | | ISBN 957-643-090-9 | Taiwan version |
| 25 Jun 1994 | Coloreado | Harushi Kimura | Victor Books | ISBN 4893891014 | |
| 1 Sep 1994 | Bomb! Momoco Tokubetsu Henshū Power Bomb Yumiko Takahashi Perfect Photo Book Saihan | | Gakken | | Band is white, the CD labels of the appendix are "Tomodachide īkara" and "Sonna no Muri!" |
| 10 Mar 1995 | Eiga Toki no Kagayaki Making Book | | Modern Art Scene | ISBN 978-4764870765 | |
| 1 May 1995 | Il Dinja Deluxe | Shinji Hosono | Gakken | ISBN 4054005187 | Hard cover version (1993 version is soft cover) |
| 30 Jul 1996 | Toriolore | Shinji Hosono | Wani Books | ISBN 4847024338 | Three-way back boxed, three books set |
| 10 Dec 1998 | Breath | Shinji Hosono | Wani Books | ISBN 4847025156 | |
| 12 Jul 2001 | Yumiko | Shinji Hosono | Sony Magazines | ISBN 4789716694 | Cardboard boxed |

== Filmography ==
=== TV dramas ===
| Dates | Title | Role | Network | Notes | Ref. |
|---|---|---|---|---|---|
| 21 Jan 1989 | Fuyu no Tabi Onna hitori | Yuka Hiraoka | TBS | | |
| 19 Jan 1990 | Choppiri Sexy Girl | Mika Hoshizawa | TBS | Lead role | |
| 28 Sep 1990 | Otome no Mystery Masashi Yokomizo Suspense: Gokumonjima | Yukie | CX | | |
| 21 Feb 1991 | Yonimo Kimyōna Monogatari Unmei no Akai Ito | Yukiko Okuda | CX | | |
| 10–24 Sep 1991 | Mesukōsei! Kiken na Arbeit | Yuka Someya | TBS | | |
| 28 Apr 1992 | Reverse and Playback | Mari Oze | NHK | Lead role | |
| 16 Nov 1992 | Fumi Saimon Selection Shōnen A B Shōjo C | | EX | | |
| 18 Feb – 18 Mar 1993 | Bokutachi no Drama Series Onegai Darling! | Kaori Nakayama (Fukuhara) | CX | | |
| 22 Oct – 3 Dec 1993 | Mōhitotsu no J-League | Yoko Mochizuki | NTV | | |
| 10 Jan – 21 Mar 1994 | Getsuyō Drama In Minami-kun no Koibito | Chiyomi Horikiri | EX | Lead role; co-starred with Shinji Takeda | |
| 12 Jan – 23 Mar 1995 | Okami Mitsuyo Jo no Tatakai | Satsuki Murasame | TBS | Lead role | |
| 10 Apr 1995 | Minami-kun no Koibito Special Mōhitotsu no Kanketsu-hen | Chiyomi Horikiri | EX | Lead role; co-starred with Shinji Takeda | |
| 17 Apr – 26 Jun 1995 | Getsuyō Drama In Saikō no Koibito | Yoshiko Yoshinaga | EX | Lead role; co-starred with Goro Inagaki | |
| 13 Feb 1996 | Kanebo Human Documentary Ikinobite | Etsuko Matsumoto (Abe) | NTV | Lead role | |
| 4–25 Mar 1996 | Īhitabidachi: 4tsu no Sotsugyō | Madoka Hamahata | CX | | |
| 18 Sep 1996 | Renai Zenya: Ichido dake 2 | Chizuru | NTV | Episode 3 "Neighbor Love"; lead role | |
| 10 Jan 1997 | Furareru Onna | Yukie Oikawa | TBS | Episode 1 "Happiness is Kowai"; lead role | |
| 16 Jan – 20 Mar 1997 | Nagare Itashichinin | Hanae Inamura | EX | | |
| 1 Jun – 14 Dec 1997 | Mouri Original Work | Eno, later Goryū no Tsubone | NHK | Indefinite appearances from episode 22 | |
| 24 Feb – 19 Mar 1998 | Drama Shinginga Niwashi Satchan | Mukaiko | NHK | Lead role | |
| 15 Apr – 1 Jul 1998 | Shomuni Dai 1 Series | Rie Hinata | CX | | |
| 7 Oct 1998 | Shomuni Series | Rie Hinata | CX | | |
| 23 Oct 1998 | Toshi no Sa Couple Keiji | Akane Murasaki | CX | Lead role | |
| 11 Nov 1998 | Itabashi Madams | Shinobu Haruya (Enka singer) | CX | Episode 5 | |
| 14 Jan – 18 Mar 1999 | Newscaster Ryoko Kan | Tamami Katsuragi | EX | | |
| 19 Jan 1999 | Koimachi | Haruko Hibino | CX | Episode 2 "Kochi Rushing 200 km! Chasing After Marriage!" | |
| 21 Apr – 30 Jun 1999 | Labrinyth | Yaharu Sahara | NTV | | |
| 10 Sep 1999 – 17 Mar 2000 | Sukitto Isshin Tasuke | Onaka | NHK | | |
| 2 Jan 2000 | Shomuni Shinshun Special | Rie Hinata | CX | | |
| 12 Apr – 28 Jun 2000 | Shomuni Dai 2 Series | Rie Hinata | CX | | |
| 14 Oct – 16 Dec 2000 | Shinjuku Bōsō Kyūkyūtai | Fuyumi Makino (cameraman) | NTV | | |
| 19 Feb 2001 | Joshi-ana. | Rumi Kinoshita (timekeeper) | CX | Episode 7 | |
| 4 Sep 2001 | Meiji Life 120th Anniversary Drama Special Natsuyasumi no Santa-san | Nami Takasugi | NTV | | |
| 7 Sep 2001 | Toshi no Sa Couple Keiji 2 | Akane Murasaki | CX | Lead role | |
| 13 Nov 2001 | Karuizawa Mystery: Matteita Onna | Fuko Kitahara | NTV | Lead role | |
| 10 Jan – 14 Mar 2002 | Marriage Love Affair | Yuri Onodera | EX | | |
| 5 Feb 2002 | Kihin-shitsu no Kaijin | Hisayo Hotta | NTV | | |
| 31 May 2002 | Kyoko Kanzaki no Miko Nikki Funtō-hen | Yuka Kanzaki | CX | | |
| 3 Jul – 18 Sep 2002 | Shomuni Final | Rie Hinata | CX | | |
| 5 Jul 2002 | Chichi Musume Tantei Kinzo & Michiru Host Club Satsujin Jiken | Michiru Haneda | CX | Semi-starring | |
| 13 Aug 2002 | Karuizawa Mystery 2: Kazetachinu | Fuko Kitahara | NTV | Lead role | |
| 1 Jan 2003 | Shomuni Forever | Rie Hinata | CX | | |
| 29 Apr 2003 | Karuizawa Mystery 3: Haru Machibito | Fuko Kitahara | NTV | Lead role | |
| 14 Jul 2003 | Yuragu Akari | Hoshimi Konno | TBS | | |
| 5 Aug 2003 | Karuizawa Mystery 4: Musume yo | Fuko Kitahara | NTV | Lead role | |
| 2 Dec 2003 | Karuizawa Mystery 5: Kowakare | Fuko Kitahara | NTV | Lead role | |
| 27 Feb 2004 | Toshi no Sa Couple Keiji 3 | Akane Murasaki | CX | Lead role | |
| 2 Nov 2004 | Karuizawa Mystery 6: Sudachi | Fuko Kitahara | NTV | Lead role | |
| 2004 | Denchi ga Kireru made | Saeko Azuma | EX | Episode 8 | |
| 23 Mar 2005 | Aibō Season 3 Saishūkai Special | Jakuren | EX | | |
| 29 Apr 2005 | Friday Night Drama Ame to Yume no ato ni | Kasumi | EX | Episode 3 | |
| 13 Jun – 12 Sep 2005 | Kochira Hon Ikegami Sho 5 | Eiko Shiina | TBS | | |
| 26 Jul 2005 | Karuizawa Mystery 7: Su-zukuri | Fuko Kitahara | NTV | Lead role | |
| 27 Feb 2006 | Hashire! Jiken Kisha | Kumiko Ikeda | TBS | | |
| 18, 19 Mar 2006 | Ai to Shi o mitsumete | Tomomi Muranaka | EX | | |
| 12 May 2007 | Maison Ikkoku: Kanketsu-hen | Akemi Roppongi | EX | | |
| 22 Jun 2007 | Shiokaze no Shinryōsho: Misaki no Doctor Funsen-ki | Toshiko Michishita | CX | | |
| 14 Jul 2007 | Shin Machiben: Otona no Deban | Maria Yonemura | NHK | Episode 3 | |
| 13 Aug 2007 | Mito Kōmon | Ohana | TBS | Part 37 Episode 19 "Enduring Endurance Brutalized/Yamagata" | |
| 24, 25 Nov 2007 | Seicho Matsumoto: Ten to Sen | Woman holding a drop | EX | | |
| 2 Jan 2008 | Shinshun Wide Jidaigeki Tokugawa Fūunroku Hachidai Shōgun Yoshimune | Tsuruhime | TX | | |
| 6 Jan – 14 Dec 2008 | Atsuhime | Karahashi | NHK | Occasional appearances | |
| 8 Feb 2008 | Miraikōshi meguru | Yuriko Ishikura | EX | Episode 5 | |
| 23 Feb 2008 | Doyō Wide Gekijō Wagashi Satsujin Jiken | Kanoko Tachibana | EX | | |
| 22 Mar 2008 | Inochi no iro enpitsu | Kanae Toshima | EX | | |
| 16, 23 Jun 2008 | Change | Naoko Matsui | CX | Episodes 6 and 7 | |
| 26 Jul 2008 | Maison Ikkoku: Rōnin-hen | Akemi Roppongi | EX | | |
| 18 Dec 2008 | Shōni Kyūmei | Hiromi Yuki | EX | Episode 9 | |
| 23 Aug 2009 | Mama wa Mukashi Papa datta | | Wowow | Episode 1 | |
| 13 Jan 2010 | Magerarenai Onna | | NTV | Episode 1 | |
| 6 Jun 2010 | Onimasa | Waka Emi | EX | | |
| 18 Jun 2010 | Hagane no Onna | Riko Kamo | EX | Episode 5 | |
| 9 May 2011 | Tsuri Keiji 2 | Kaede | TBS | | |
| 7 Jul 2011 | Kyoto Chiken no Onna Dai 7 Series | Shiho Matsuoka | EX | Episode 1 | |
| 19, 26 Nov 2011 | Doyō Drama Special Chōchō-san: Saigo no Bushi no Musume | Otaka | NHK | | |
| 9 May 2012 | Uso no Shōmei: Hanzai Shinri Bunsekikan Keiko Kajiwara 1 | Hitomi Takashima | TX | | |
| 7 Jun 2012 | Shin Omiyasan | Momoko Iijima | EX | Episode 8 | |
| 6 Oct 2012 | High School Uta Gekidan Otoko-gumi | Hana Midorikawa | TBS | Produced by CBC | |
| 10 Jul 2013 | Shomuni 2013 | Rie Hinata | CX | Episode 1 | |
| 22 Jul 2013 | Shugoshin Bodyguard Teru Shindo | Hitomi Iijima | TBS | Episode 2 | |
| 5 Oct 2013 | Tsuki ni Inoru Pierrot | Megumi Ikeba | TBS | Produced by CBC | |
| 21 May 2014 | Hokkai Dōkei Jiken File: Keibuho: Seiko Gojo 2 | Riko Sasamura | TX | | |
| 17 Jul 2014 | Mokuyō Jidaigeki Yoshiwara Ura Dōshin | Prostitute | NHK | Episode 4 | |
| 12 Sep 2014 | Shizuko Natsuki Suspense Onna Ukeoinin: Shikake rareta Onna no Wana | | CX | | |
| 5 Jul 2015 – | Hana Moyu | Ohashita Atama Shino | NHK | Occasional appearances | |
| 26 Feb 2016 | Premium Friday Keibuho Jotaro Sasaki 8 | Keiko Tanaka | CX | | |
| 2 Mar 2016 – | Asadora Asa ga Kita | Funa Tamura | NHK | | |
| 6 Feb 2017 | Getsuyō Meisaku Gekijō Anmitsu Kenji no Sōsa File 2 | Taeko Okamura | TBS | | |

=== Films, direct-to-video ===
| Date | Title | Role | Notes |
|---|---|---|---|
| 1989 | Suna no Ue no Robinson | Seiko Ueshima | |
| 1990 | Popcorn Love Episode 1 Fan Club no Onna Indies Kids | Jun Shimauchi | |
| 1991 | Yonimo Kaikina Monogatari Chōjō Makai-hen Boku no Kanojo wa Mystery Ann | Ruru/Ruruko | |
| 1992 | Chibi Maruko-chan: My Favorite Song | Shoko Kimura (voice) | |
| 1995 | Toki no Kagyaki | Yuka Kanzaki | |
| 2001 | Money Zansu Go! Go! Uchū Doctors | | |
| 2018 | Summer Blooms | Shinobu | |
| 2025 | Shinpei | Ichiko Shimamura | |

=== Music videos ===
| Year | Title | Album | Artist | Ref. |
|---|---|---|---|---|
| 2019 | "Coexist" | The Side Effects | Coldrain | |

=== Stage ===
| Dates | Title | Role | Location | Notes | Ref. |
|---|---|---|---|---|---|
| 1989 | Sleeping Beauty | White fairy | Mitsukoshi Theater | | |
| 1993 | Anne of Green Gables | Anne Shirley | Nippon Seinenkan | | |
| 1997 | Annie Get Your Gun | Annie Oakley | Shinjuku Koma Theater, Chunichi Theatre | | |
| 1998 | Agatha | Villa Agatha | Aoyama Round Theatre | | |
| 2000 | Shin Jigoku Hen | Yayoi | New National Theatre, Tokyo Small Theatre | | |
| 2001 | Yajū Rōkenzan | Midoro | Aoyama Theatre | | |
| 2002 | Butterflies Are Free | Jill | Parco Theater | | |
| 2002 | Inokori Saheiji | Oume | Meiji-za | | |
| Oct–Dec 2002 | Mozart! | Nannerl Mozart | Nissay Theatre | | |
| 2003 | Hana no Benitengu | Akane Akamakigami | Le Theatre Ginza | | |
| 2003–04 | Les Misérables | Fantine | Imperial Theatre | | |
| Dec 2004 – Jan 2005 | Shiroh | Juan Yamada | Imperial Theatre | | |
| 2004 | Tōmei Ningen no Jōki | Aizen wig nurse soldier | New National Theater | | |
| 2004 | Mahiru no Bitch | Kyoko | Theatre Apple | | |
| 2004 | Miss Saigon | Ellen | Imperial Theatre | | |
| Jun–Aug, Oct–Nov 2005 | Mozart! | Nannerl Mozart | Imperial Theatre | | |
| 2006 | Chikyū Gorgeous vol.8 Humanity The Musical | Miyo-chan/Evil spirit | Shinjuku Koma Theater | | |
| 2006 | Golf the Musical–Golf Nante Daikirai! | Ruri Itoman | Parco Theater | | |
| Nov–Dec 2007 | Mozart! | Nannerl Mozart | Imperial Theatre | | |
| 2007 | Jigokubakkei: Ukiyo Hyakkei | Koito | Setagaya Public Theater | | |
| 2007 | Yoi no Genji Monogatari –Funnikurakan Pavilion– | | Kyoto Kaikan | Cameo/recitation Rokujō Miyasu Dokoro -"Aoi" no Jō yori- | |
| 2008 | Hoshikuzu no Machi –Shinjuku Kabuki-cho Hen– Koma Theater Special | Mimi Akaba | Shinjuku Koma Theater | | |
| 2008 | Kūchū Buranko | Eri Yamashita | Tokyo Metropolitan Theatre Medium Hall | | |
| 2008 | Kenka Nōka | Masami Masaka | Theater Tops | | |
| 2009 | Inran Saieisen | Ohan | Auru Supotto | | |
| 2009 | Evil Dead The Musical –The Evil Dead– | Linda | Sunshine Theater | | |
| 2009 | El Sur –Waga Kokoro no Hakata, soshite Nishitetsu Lions– | Yukari | Honda Theater | | |
| 2009 | Banderas to Yūutsu na Coffee | Secretary of State Baker | Setagaya Public Theater | | |
| 2010 | Ashita no Kōfuku-ron | Yoshiko | Nakano Theatre Bonbon | | |
| 2010 | Guys and Dolls | Miss Adelaide | Theatre Creation | | |
| 2010 | Guys and Dolls | Miss Adelaide | Chunichi Theater | | |
| 2010 | Enemy | Elder sister Sae Naoki | New National Theater | | |
| Nov–Dec 2010 | Mozart! | Nannerl Mozart | Imperial Theatre | | |
| Jan 2011 | Mozart! | Nannerl Mozart | Umeda Arts Theater, Kanazawa Opera | | |
| 2011 | Harolco | Harolco | Akasaka RED Theater | | |
| Jul 2011 | Ritaldand | | Parco Theater | | |
| Aug 2011 | Ritaldand | | Art Pier Hall, Theater Brava! | | |
| Oct–Nov 2011 | Rock Of Ages | Justice/Sherrie's Mother | Tokyo International Forum Hall C, Morinomiya Piloti Hall, Almonie Thank Kitakyushu Soleil Hall | | |
| Mar 2012 | Wonder Garden <Fourth Edition> | | Za · Koenji 1 | | |
| Apr 2012 | Wonder Garden <Fourth Edition> | | Shin Kobe Oriental Theater | | |
| Jun–Jul 2012 | Linda Linda | Kaori | Kinokuniya Hall | | |
| Jul 2012 | Linda Linda | Kaori | Morinomiya Piloti Hall | | |
| Aug 2012 | Linda Linda | Kaori | Fukuoka Momochi Palace | | |
| 5–10 Sep 2012 | Niagara | | Shimokitazawa Station Front Theater | Guest participation | |
| 10–16 Sep 2012 | Inu, dareru | | Shinjuku Sun Mall Studio | | |
| Dec 2012 – Jan 2013 | Zipang Punk–Goemon Rock III | Harungeni | Shibuya Tokyu Theater Orb | | |
| Jan–Feb 2013 | Zipang Punk–Goemon Rock III | Harungeni | Osaka Orix's Theater | | |
| 2–10 Nov 2013 | Shawshank no Sora ni | | Ikebukuro Sunshine Theater | | |
| 2014 | Gekidan Hobo Dai 6-kai Kōen | | Shimokitazawa Station Front Theater | | |
| 1–25 Feb 2014 | Haha o tazunete Hizakurige | | Shimbashi Playhouse | | |
| 19–20 Apr 2014 | Rōdoku Geki Ano Ni, Boshi wa Omokatta –Uta to Rōdoku de tsuzuru Otoko-tachi no Yūjō to, Kanojo no Monogatari– | | Tennozu Ginga Theater | | |
| 3–27 Jun 2014 | Haha o tazunete Hizakurige | | Osaka Shochikuza | | |
| 5–25 Sep 2015 | Hakata Koibito Katachi | | Fukuoka / Hakataza | Sayuri Ishikawa Hakataza Part 1 of the special performance in September; special appearance on the stage of the second part | |
| 13 Nov – 6 Dec 2015 | Morse | Mother | Tokyo Globe Theatre | | |
| 9–13 Dec 2015 | Morse | Mother | Theater Brava! | | |
| 13 Apr – 29 May 2016 | Ne Tora re Munesuke | Reiko | Theater 1010, Osaka Shochikuza, Momochi Palace, Kariya City Comprehensive Cultural Center, Shimbashi Playhouse | | |

=== Concerts, live ===
==== Solo tours ====
| Dates | Title | Notes |
|---|---|---|
| 20–25 Jul 1991 | Yumiko Takahashi To-ki-me-ki '91 Ochūgen matsuri | 3 locations in Nagoya, Osaka, Tokyo; 4 performances |
| 1–15 Aug 1992 | Natsu da! Yumiko da! Zenin Shūgō! | 5 performances in Nagoya, Osaka, Ōmiya, Tokyo, Yokohama |
| 2–10 Jul 1993 | Hajimari wa Ima... | 3 locations in Nagoya, Osaka, Tokyo; 5 performances |
| 19 Aug – 13 Sep 1994 | Tenderly Tour'94 | 11 places in Kanto region, Miyagi, Nagoya, Osaka, Hiroshima; 12 performances |

==== Single solo ====
| Date | Title | Location | Notes |
|---|---|---|---|
| 26 Oct 1992 | Playboy Concert | Osaka | |
| 9 Nov 1992 | Playboy Concert | Tokyo | |
| 31 Mar 1994 | '94 Haruichiban Yumiko Takahashi Concert | Sun Pearl Arakawa | |
| 2 Nov 1996 | Ama Super Cross | Fukuoka Dome | Guest live |
| 7 Sep 1996 | Hiroshima Green Festa '97 Yumiko Takahashi Concert enjoy my flower | Akasaka Blitz | |
| 11 Oct 1997 | Special Live "Everything is Fine" | Hiroshima University Headquarters site | |
| 25 Jul 1999 | Yumiko Takahashi Concert Celine Dion o Utau | Shibuya Theater Cocoon | |
| 26 Jul 2009 | Yumiko Takahashi Live@Kurie 3,680-Nichi-buri no, konnichiwa. Yumiko Live | Hibiya Theater Kurie | |

=== Events ===
==== Live guest appearances ====
| Dates | Title | Location |
|---|---|---|
| 19–20 Sep 1994 | Toho Entertainment Musical Charity Concert "Espoir –Kibō o motte–" | International Forum Hall C |
| 2–5 Oct 2014 | Isetan Mitsukoshi Premium Entertainment Cruise "Musical ni Koishite" | Luxury cruise ship Nippon Maru |
| 29–30 Oct 2015 | Gekidan Shin Kan-sen 35 Shūnenkinen Ongaku-sai "MMF Music Movie Festival" | Toyosu Pit |
| 6–7 Feb 2016 | Kohki Okada 25 Shūnenkinen Musical Live "Kohki Okada presents I Love Musical" | Tokyo Globe Theatre |

==== Single events ====
| Date | Title | Location | Notes |
|---|---|---|---|
| 24 Oct 2015 | Cycle Festa in Saitama Criterium | Saitama Criterium Talk Show | |

=== Radio ===
| Title | Network |
|---|---|
| Sailor Fuku no sasayaki 2 | MBS |
| Yumiko Takhashi no Oshaberi Tenshi | NCB |
| Yumiko Takahashi: Circle | NCB |
| Yumiko Takahashi: Circle D | NCB |
| Bay Morning Glory | Bay FM |
| Kimamani Classic | NHK FM |

=== Variety ===
| Dates | Title | Network | Notes |
|---|---|---|---|
| | Star Dokkiri (Hi) Hōkoku | CX | Neoki Dokkiri |
| 1992 | Totsuzen Variety Sokuhō!! Count Down 100 | TBS | Quasi-regular |
| | Quiz! Toshi no Sa nante | CX | Regular |
| Apr 1992 – Sep 1993 | Ultra 7:00 | NTV | Regular |
| | Paradise Stadium | NTV | Regular |
| 1993 | Ochanoko Saisai | TBS | Regular |
| Apr–Jun 1993 | Utchan Nanchan no Yarunara Yaraneba | | Quasi-regular |
| Apr – 24 Sep 1994 | Soliton: Kin no Ono Gin no Ono | NHK E | Moderator |
| 14 Apr 1996 – 30 Mar 1997 | Sekai Ulrun Taizai-ki | MBS, TBS | Sub-moderator |
| 2003 | Sujinashi | TBS | Produced by CBC |
| 16 Dec 2014 | Night Comedy Tonari no Shimura Dai 1-kai | NHK G | |

=== TV programmes ===
| Date | Title | Network | Notes | Ref. |
|---|---|---|---|---|
| 18 Apr 1990 | Tokyo Yellow Page | TBS | Step by Step and Fight! | |
| 2009 | Holiday Nippon | NHK G | Narration | |
| 2010 | Ohanashi no kuni | NHK E | "Kumanoko Wolf" narrator | |
| 2012 | Garfield 2 | Cartoon Network | Voice | |
| 2014 | Otona no Europa-gai Aruki | BS NTV | Navigator | |
| 24 Aug 2015 | -Shūkan City Promotion- Gotōji Saturday | J-Com | | |

=== Advertisements ===
| Years | Title | Ref. |
|---|---|---|
| 1990 | Lotte "Hachimitsu Gummy" | |
| 1991 | Sega TeraDrive, Game Gear | |
| 1991–92 | Ozaki Corporation "Kankō Gakusei-fuku" | |
| 1991–93 | Myojo Foods "Yashokutei" | |
| 1993 | Cow Brand Soap Kyoshinsha "Narity" | |
| 1993–96 | Sumitomo Life | |
| 1994–98 | Cow Brand Soap Kyoshinsha "Celeb", "Celeb Shampoo" | |
| 1994–95 | Mister Donut | |
| 1994–96 | Aeon Eikaiwa & Ryūgaku | |
| 1994–99 | Eisai "Chocola BB" | |
| 1998–99 | Sanyo Foods "Sapporo Ichiban donburi" | |
| 2003 | Yomeishu Seizo Company, Limited "Medicated Savage Sake" | |
| 2020 | Game Gear Micro promotional video | |

=== Others ===
| Year | Title | Role | Notes |
|---|---|---|---|
| 1999 | Oshiruko-hime: Jikū no Bōken | Oshiruko-hime | Video for tax education planning by the National Tax Agency |

== People who share the same name ==
- 1949 born Hotokekunitera chief priest (now, Yakushi hermitage Myoen). Wrote many health-related books. Natural Buddhist temple
- Actress and model born on 1989. Yumiko Takahashi official blog
- Vocalist of the musical unit Akane. Akane official website
  Yumiko Takahashi who is singing on the CD of Genso Water Margin series.
