= Owaranai Christmas =

Single by Akinori Nakagawa
- Released: November 21, 2007
- Length: 5:14
- Label: Tokuma Japan
- Songwriter(s): Shinji Harada

Akinori Nakagawa singles chronology
"Seru no Koi" (2005)	"Owaranai Christmas" (2007)

"Owaranai Christmas" is a song written by Shinji Harada.

== Track listing ==
No.	Title	Length
1.	"Owaranai Christmas"	5:14
2.	"Amazing Grace"	4:39
3.	"Owaranai Christmas Instrumental"	5:14
