= Shinka-ron =

Box set by Akinori Nakagawa
- Released: June 20, 2007
- Genre: J-POP
- Length: Disc one 160 minutes Disc two 160 minutes Disc three 60 minutes

Shinka-ron is Akinori Nakagawa's box set DVD.

== Disc one ==
Himself Live film DVD
- Starring: Akinori Nakagawa
- Music by: Akinori Nakagawa
- Release date: 2007
- Country: Japan
- Language: Japanese

Himself is a musical based on the William Shakespeare play Hamlet. All twenty-four musical numbers are written by Akinori Nakagawa.

=== Casts ===
- Akinori Nakagawa
- Keigo Yoshino
- Shinya Nino
- Nozomi Ando
- Kentaro Hayami
- Ken Nakagawa
- Hikari Ono
- Chiaki Kosaka
- Tetsuro Sagawa

== Disc two ==
Blue Dream Live film DVD
- Starring: Akinori Nakagawa
- Music by: Akinori Nakagawa
- Release date: 2007
- Country: Japan
- Language: Japanese

Blue Dream is an Akinori Nakagawa's musical. The play is consist of three part.

=== Cast ===
- Akinori Nakagawa

=== Track listing ===
No.	Title	Length
1.	"I Will Get Your Kiss"
2.	"I Say Good-bye"
3.	"We Will Let You Go/Brand"
4.	"Without You Girl"
5.	"Blue Dream"
6.	"What Are You Afraid Of?"
7.	"フタツ,ヒトツ"
8.	"Haiiro no Ame (灰色の雨)"
9.	"Count Up My Love"
10.	"Listen"
11.	"My Heart Is Calling You"
12.	"Mayonaka no Carnival (真夜中のカーニバル)-Matador"
13.	"Don’t Change My Soul"
14.	"Jonetsu to Shinjitsu no Aida (情熱と真実の間)"
15.	"Sadness"
16.	"Blue Sky (ブルースカイ)"
17.	"Lonely Man"
18.	"Forever And More"
19.	"Hamlet"
20.	"Peaceful Revolution"

== Disc three ==
Title : Special X The disc contains Akinori Nakagawa's interview about Blue Dream and Himself.
