= Mars: Tada, Kimi wo Aishiteru (film) =

- Poster
- Kanji: MARS～ただ、君を愛してる～
- Directed by: Saiji Yakumo
- Screenplay by: Tetsuya Ōishi
- Based on: Mars by Fuyumi Soryo
- Starring: Taisuke Fujigaya; Masataka Kubota; Marie Iitoyo; Hirona Yamazaki; Yu Inaba
- Music by: Tarō Makido
- Distributed by: Showgate
- Release date: June 18, 2016
- Running time: 98 minutes
- Country: Japan
- Language: Japanese

Mars: Tada, Kimi wo Aishiteru (MARS～ただ、君を愛してる～) is a 2016 Japanese youth romantic drama film directed by Saiji Yakumo, written by Tetsuya Ōishi and starring Taisuke Fujigaya, Masataka Kubota, Marie Iitoyo, Hirona Yamazaki and Yu Inaba. The film is the finale for the Japanese television drama series of the same name and based on the manga series Mars, written and illustrated by Fuyumi Soryo. It was released in Japan by Showgate on June 18, 2016.

== Plot ==
Kira Aso (Marie Iitoyo) is a high school student with an introverted personality. When she was a child, her father died in a car accident caused by a motorcycle gang. Now, she sketches the sea everyday during her spring break. One day, Rei Kashino (Taisuke Fujigaya) rides his motorcycle and sees Kira Aso sketching the sea. He sits next to her. Kira isn't used to talking to guys and isn't friendly to Rei Kashino.

The new semester begins. Kira Aso meets Rei Kashino as her classmate. Rei Kashino doesn't get interested in particular style of girls, but he becomes interested in Kira Aso. Harumi Sugihara (Hirona Yamazaki), who likes Rei, and Tatsuya Kida (Yu Inaba), who is Rei ’s friend, are surprised in Rei's interest for Kira.

Makio Kirishima (Masataka Kubota) graduated from the same middle school as Rei Kashino and transfers to the same high school as Rei. The relationship between Kira Aso and Rei Kashino changes.

== Cast ==
- Taisuke Fujigaya as Rei Kashino
- Masataka Kubota as Masao Kirishima
- Marie Iitoyo as Kira Asō
- Hirona Yamazaki as Harumi Sugihara
- Yu Inaba as Tatsuya Kida
- Gōki Maeda
- Haruka Fukuhara
- Rika Adachi
