= Mars (manga) =

Japanese manga series written and illustrated by Fuyumi Soryo

- Cover of the first tankōbon volume of Mars, published in Japan by Kodansha on May 13, 1996

マース (māsu)
- Genre: Romance, Drama, Coming-of-age, Soap opera
- Manga
- Written by: Fuyumi Soryo
- Published by: Kodansha
- English publisher: NA: Tokyopop (former) Kodansha USA (current)
- Magazine: Bessatsu Friend
- English magazine: Smile
- Original run: February 1996 – December 2000
- Volumes: 15
- Manga

A Horse With No Name
- Written by: Fuyumi Soryo
- Published by: Kodansha
- English publisher: Tokyopop
- Magazine: Bessatsu Friend
- Published: 1999
- Volumes: 1
- Television drama

Mars: Tada Kimi wo Aishiteru
- Original network: Nippon TV
- Original run: January 24, 2016 – March 27, 2016
- Live-action film
- Mars: Tada, Kimi wo Aishiteru (film)

Mars (Japanese: マース, Hepburn: Māsu) is a Japanese manga series written and illustrated by Fuyumi Soryo. Initially serialized in Bessatsu Friend from 1996 to 2000, the series spans 15 tankōbon volumes. It follows the teenage romance between Kira Aso, an introverted artist, and Rei Kashino, a troubled playboy who is a professional motorcycle racer. A single volume prequel, Mars: A Horse With No Name was released in 1999.

The manga was licensed for an English language release by Tokyopop, but now Kodansha USA will put out a new hardcover eight-volume edition-for the series' 30th anniversary-in 2026. The series was adapted into a 21 episode Taiwanese television drama in 2004. A Japanese television drama series adaptation titled Mars: Tada Kimi wo Aishiteru (MARS～ただ、君を愛してる～) was broadcast on Nippon TV from January 24 to March 27, 2016 and a live action film adaptation of the same name was released in Japan on June 18, 2016.

The main series was very well received by critics, who praised its sensitive coverage of a wide range of intense topics, and its excellent romance. A prequel series was released, but critics considered it inferior to the main series.

== Plot ==
Kira Aso and Rei Kashino meet when Rei asks Kira for directions to a local hospital one day in the park. In response, she draws him a map and hands it to him without saying a word. Rei is intrigued by Kira after he finds that the back of the map has a picture Kira drew of a mother and child. On the first day of school they are both surprised to find that they are in the same class. Later, Rei walks in on their teacher sexually harassing Kira. Rei promises to protect Kira in exchange for a painted version of the sketch that was on the back of the map. He also offers to "lend Kira his body," and she asks him to model for her. Thus beginning a relationship that is opposed by the world in general. They draw on their love for each other to heal the wounds the world has left on them; Rei, the scars from his twin's suicide for which he blames himself, and Kira, her hatred of men due to her stepfather having raped her when she was in middle school.

== Characters ==
- Kira Aso (麻生 キラ, Asō Kira) is a teenage artist who lives with her mother and is Rei's love interest. Her father died in a car accident involving a motorcycle gang when she was ten years old. Her stepfather raped her when she was fourteen years old; due to the trauma caused by the experience, Kira becomes a withdrawn and timid loner. When Kira's mother finally discovers what happened, she separates from her husband and begins living alone with Kira.
- Rei Kashino (樫野 零, Kashino Rei) is an extroverted playboy who rides motorcycles on the professional circuit with dreams of becoming a professional racer but is plagued with a troubled childhood. In junior high, his younger twin committed suicide right in front of him, leaving deep scars. Despite his dark and mysterious past, he remains cheerful, and other people are easily drawn to him. After modeling for Kira, the unlikely pair begin to fall in love. Throughout his life he finds himself drawn to violence, such as having attempted to shoot one of Sei's bullies without knowing the gun was not loaded as a kid, threatening to harm the English teacher who had molested Kira, and attempting to kill Kira's step-father.
- Tatsuya Kida (木田 達也, Kida Tatsuya) is Rei's best friend who also had a crush on Kira while they attended junior high together. By the end of the manga, he and Harumi are a couple.
- Harumi Sugihara (杉原 晴美, Sugihara Harumi) is a female classmate of Kira and Rei's. She's been "in love" with Rei ever since they slept together in their freshman year. Although she initially makes Kira a target of brutal psychological attacks because of the growing connection between her and Rei, she later reforms and becomes a solid and protective friend.
- Shiori Sakurazawa (桜沢 しおり, Sakurazawa Shiori) is a girl from Rei's past. Originally Sei's girlfriend at first, she then left Sei for Rei. She was the only girl that the two brothers both liked. She blames herself for Sei's death, and also tried to kill herself because she "couldn't live without either one of them (Rei and Sei)".
- Masao Kirishima (桐島 牧生, Kirishima Masao) is an effeminate sociopath who was often bullied by his only friend, Yuji Aoki. Rei had saved Masao from being beaten to death at one point in time, but he barely remembers this event as the action was impulsive because Rei was still in shock over Sei's death. Soon after this incident, Masao kills Aoki. Masao admits to having a crush on Rei, but he also claims to have a crush on Kira.
- Sei Kashino is the younger twin brother of Rei. An artist like Kira, he was timid and always bullied, having to have his brother stand up for him. He was the one that found out that their father was not their real father. In junior high, he committed suicide by jumping off the school building killing himself right in front of Rei, leaving Rei with very deep emotional scars. Sei told his brother in his suicide letter that he wanted to leave those scars and that he had a darker mind than he thought because he wanted Rei to kill someone.

== Media ==
=== Manga ===
Written and illustrated by Fuyumi Soryo, the chapters of Mars were serialized in Bessatsu Friend from 1995 to 2000. They were collected and published in 15 tankōbon volumes by Kodansha. The first volume was published on May 13, 1996; the last on December 13, 2000. A short prequel series, Mars: A Horse With No Name (MARS外伝 名前のない馬, MARS Gaiden Namae no Nai Uma), was serialized in the same magazine in 1999, and its chapters were published in a single tankōbon volume on December 9, 1999. From October 12, 2006, through January 12, 2007, Kodansha republished the series in Japan across eight kanzenban special edition volumes, collecting more chapters in each volume.

The manga series was licensed for an English language release in North America by Tokyopop. The first five chapters were serialized in Smile starting in the October 2001 issue, and running until the March 2001 issue. which published all fifteen volumes from April 23, 2002, through November 2003. It released A Horse With No Name in July 2004. Both titles are now considered "out of print" by Tokyopop. In 2023, Kodansha published the series in English on their K Manga service.

=== Live action television series ===
In 2004, a twenty-one episode Taiwanese drama based on the manga series was broadcast on Chinese Television System starring Vic Zhou and Barbie Hsu. In Mars (traditional Chinese: 戰神MARS; simplified Chinese: 战神MARS; pinyin: Zhànshén Mars) the characters names were changed to Chinese names for localization, but it otherwise follows the manga's general plot. Another difference between media is that Rei Kashino drives a Ducati Monster motorcycle in the manga while Ling Chen drives a Yamaha Fazer in the drama. It was voted Favorite Drama of the Year at the 40th Annual 2005 Golden Bell Awards, and was the highest rated program in 2005 when it aired on the Philippine network QTV.

The live-action series uses two pieces of theme music, one opening and one ending theme. "零" (lit. "Zero") by Alan Kuo is used for the opening, while "Rang Wo Ai Ni" by Vic Zhou and Barbie Hsu is used for the ending.

In 2016 NTV aired a new television drama adaption named Mars: Tada, Kimi wo Aishiteru! (Mars: But, I Love You! Japanese: MARS〜ただ、君を愛してる〜 ) which premiered in January, starring Taisuke Fujigaya as Rei Kashino and Masataka Kubota as Makio Kirishima. Both actors are listed as "double stars" of the series. Marie Iitoyo plays Kira Aso. The series will conclude its story with a film which will open in theaters throughout Japan on June 18, 2016.

=== Film ===
A live-action film adaptation and finale for the Japanese television drama series was released on June 18, 2016.

== Reception ==
In Understanding Manga and Anime, Robin E. Brenner lists the title among her recommendations for "Best Romances and Melodrama", stating that "this manga romance literally has it all: romance, motorcycle races, bullying, haunted pasts, child abuse, friendly transvestites, murder, sociopaths, and more romance." She considered it an appealing "soap opera", and praised the scene where Rei and Kira make love as "gentle, sweet, and very much focused on the emotional impact on this progression in their relationship" versus being focused on "titillating readers". Reviewing the fourth volume to the series for Library Journal, Steve Raiteri considered Soryo's artwork "clean" and felt it did an expert job in "[portraying] Shiori's desperation, Kira's sadness and uncertainty, and Rei's living-in-the-moment changeability". Speaking to the series as a whole, he stated that it would appeal to both teen girls and to older readers due to its "depth and quality".

Though Ross Liversidge of the online magazine UK Anime Network had low expectations for the series, he found it to be "flawless". Rating it a 10 out of 10, he considered its strong points to be its "delicate and detailed" artwork and, most importantly, its "normality, stating that it "smacks of a tragedy waiting to happen, and there are times even in this first volume that things start to get serious...but its done so well, and in such an understated manner that its utterly absorbing and keeps your attention." Manga: The Complete Guide's author Jason Thompson highly praised the work, rating it four out of four stars. Calling it a "well-written, tightly plotted romance" that successfully deals with range of "powerful issues" that avoids being "preachy or patronizing", he considered Soryo's artwork to be "clear and attractive". However, he felt its prequel, Mars: Horse With No Name, did not add much to the overall story, noting that only the title story actually relates to the series. While he still praised the artwork and rated it three stars, he also considered the stories were "pale in comparison" to the original.

Manga Life's Park Cooper praised the original Mars, noting that they "love[d] the characters, the story, and the tension that lies within the situations", but did not recommend doing more than browsing Horse With No Name, finding it to be less impressive and unlikely to appeal even to fans of the main series. He felt the titular story, which tells how Kira and Tatsuya became friends, to be "disappointing" and did not find it to be up to the same standard as the main series. However, he praised the second story, "Sleeping Lion", as making the volume worth the purchase and containing "the type of context in the story that got me to love MARS in the first place." The final story, "A One-Carat Fruit", he considered unengaging and left him unable to connect with the central characters. Overall, Cooper noted that while Soryo's artwork was not unique, she created "incredible looking characters" and "did a great job making certain expressions of the characters feel convincing."
