= China Council for the Promotion of International Trade =

Chinese government trade body

- 中国国际贸易促进委员会
- Logo of the CCPIT

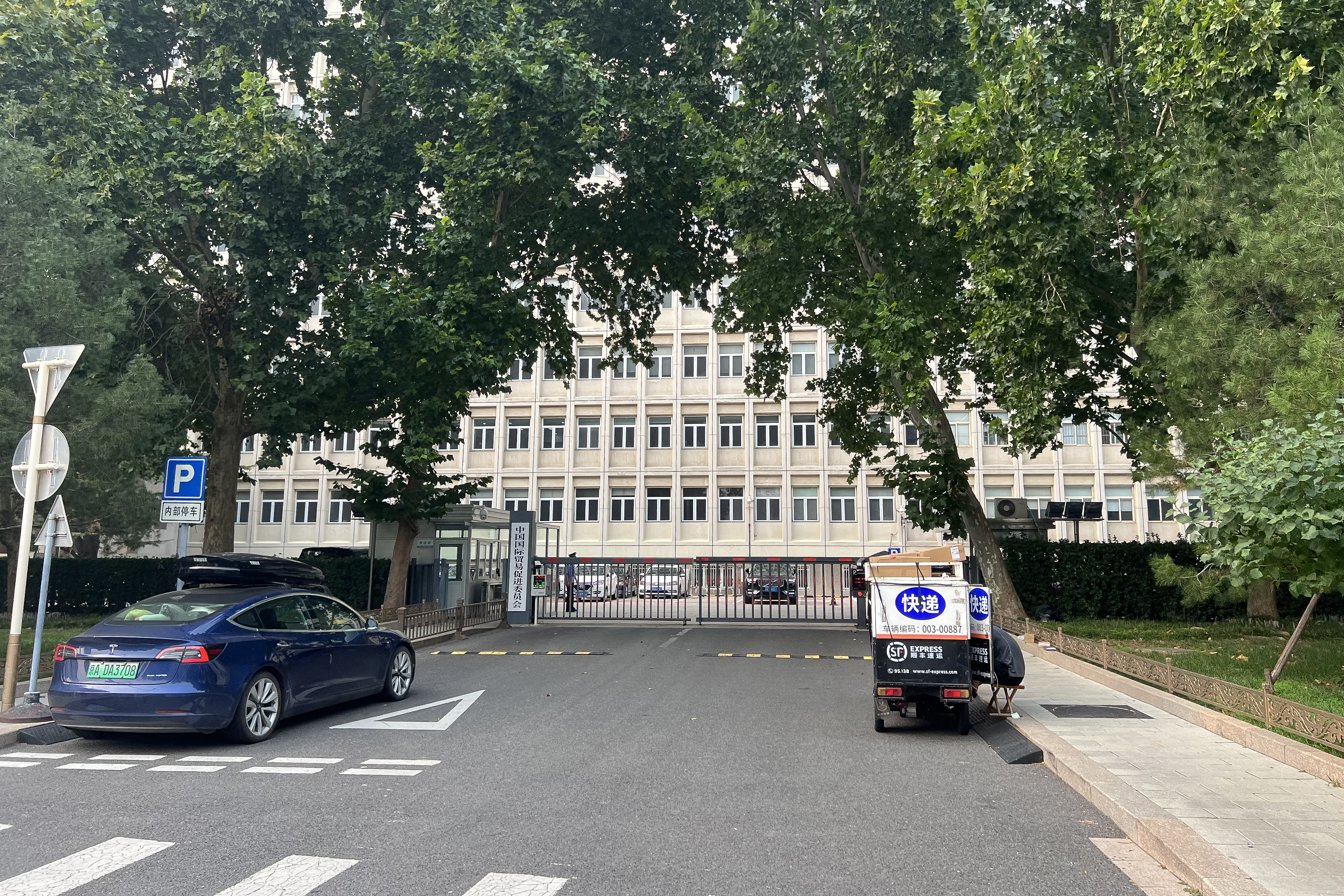
- CCPIT headquarters in Beijing
- Formation: 1952; 74 years ago
- Type: People's organization
- Headquarters: 1 Fuxingmenwai Street, Xicheng District, Beijing
- Affiliations: Ministry of Commerce
- Website: en.ccpit.org

China Council for the Promotion of International Trade
- Simplified Chinese: 中国国际贸易促进委员会
- Traditional Chinese: 中國國際貿易促進委員會
Transcriptions
Standard Mandarin
- Hanyu Pinyin: Zhōngguó Guójì Màoyì Cùjìn Wěiyuánhuì

Abbreviation
- Simplified Chinese: 中国贸促会
- Traditional Chinese: 中國貿促會
Transcriptions
Standard Mandarin
- Hanyu Pinyin: Zhōngguó Màocùhuì

China Chamber of International Commerce
- Simplified Chinese: 中国国际商会
- Traditional Chinese: 中國國際商會
Transcriptions
Standard Mandarin
- Hanyu Pinyin: Zhōngguó Guójì Shānghuì

The China Council for the Promotion of International Trade (CCPIT), also called the China Chamber of International Commerce (CCOIC), is a people's organization and trade body founded in 1952. CCPIT is linked to the Ministry of Commerce.

== History ==
In response to the COVID-19 pandemic, CCPIT was charged with issuing force majeure certificates to Chinese companies unable to meet their contractual trade obligations. In September 2023, CCPIT criticized the CHIPS and Science Act.

== Functions ==
The CCPIT develops business cooperation and exchanges with foreign countries and has long been associated with the Chinese Communist Party's united front strategy. It is charged with organizing trade fairs and events in promotion of the Belt and Road Initiative.

== See also ==
- China International Contractors Association
- China Investment Promotion Agency
