= Cesare (manga) =

Japanese manga series by Fuyumi Soryo

- Cesare: Hakai no Sōzō-sha
- Cover the first tankōbon volume

チェーザレ 破壊の創造者 (Chēzare: Hakai no Sōzō-sha)
- Genre: Biographical, historical
- Manga
- Written by: Fuyumi Soryo
- Published by: Kodansha
- Imprint: KC Deluxe
- Magazine: Morning
- Original run: March 24, 2005 – November 25, 2021
- Volumes: 13
- Manga

Canzoniere
- Written by: Fuyumi Soryo
- Published by: Kodansha
- Magazine: Morning Two
- Original run: February 27, 2025 – June 5, 2025
- Volumes: 1

Cesare: Hakai no Sōzō-sha (Japanese: チェーザレ 破壊の創造者, Hepburn: Chēzare: Hakai no Sōzō-sha; "Cesare: The Creator of Destruction"), also known as Cesare: Il Creatore che ha distrutto, (Note: The title is written in both Japanese and Italian on the Japanese tankōbon covers.) is a Japanese historical manga series written and illustrated by Fuyumi Soryo. The story follows the early life of Cesare Borgia, a 15th-century Italian aristocrat, politician, and mercenary leader. In creating Cesare, Soryo collaborated with Dante scholar Motoaki Hara to bring Renaissance Italy to life in great and accurate detail. The manga was serialized in Kodansha's seinen (young men's) manga magazine Morning from March 2005 to November 2021 and collected into 13 tankōbon (compiled volumes). The manga also inspired a stage musical adaptation, which was canceled before its debut in April 2020 due to the COVID-19 pandemic. Instead, a live concert was held in July 2020. The musical was finally performed in January and February 2023.

== Synopsis ==
Cesare is about the life of one of history's most enigmatic figures: Cesare Borgia, an Italian aristocrat, politician, and mercenary leader during the Renaissance. The manga takes an intimate look at Cesare's life during his matriculation at the University of Pisa, at the age of 15, in the years preceding his appointment as a cardinal of the Holy See.

== Characters ==
- Cesare Borgia: Installed at Pisa by his father Rodrigo Borgia, a cardinal, purportedly to earn his doctorate in theology. However, it is soon made obvious that Cesare's presence in Pisa is engineered by his father in order to support the rise of the Borgia family in power and the impending ascension of Rodrigo Borgia to the papacy.
- Michelotto da Corella: Cesare's faithful right-hand man. An orphaned Sephardi Jew who was taken into Rodrigo Borgia's household, and of an age with Cesare.
- Angelo da Canossa: A new student at Pisa, Angelo proves to be a fish out of water. Having lived a sheltered life with his grandfather in a remote province, he retains a social clumsiness that gets him in trouble at his first day in school. It is only through Cesare's timely intervention that Angelo begins to realize his awkward and lackadaisical upbringing. It is through the eyes of Angelo that we primarily learn Cesare's multifaceted motivations and the beginnings of his ambitions.

Cesare's life and world overlaps with the politics of his father and his father's allies and enemies.

- Rodrigo Borgia: The Borgias, who were based in Valencia, Spain, were known to be ruthless in the pursuit of their ambitions. Although a cardinal of the Roman Catholic Church, and by rule forbidden to marry or have children due to the clerical vow of celibacy, Rodrigo acknowledged Cesare as well as some of his illegitimate children and used their talents to perpetuate the power of the Borgias throughout Europe and support him in his rise as Pope Alexander VI.
- Giuliano della Rovere: A cardinal and chief rival of Rodrigo Borgia for the papacy. Related to the Pazzi Conspiracy, of which Giuliano de' Medici, the younger brother of lord Lorenzo and Giovanni's uncle, was murdered. He will become Pope with the name of Julius II.
- Raffaele Riario: Related to the Roveres through ties of marriage, he is allegedly one of Guiliano's supporters and a key conspirator in the Pazzi Conspiracy.
- Lorenzo de' Medici: A wealthy Italian statesman. He is a patron of scholars, artists, and poets. Such was his role for Angelo da Canossa's grandfather, a sculptor. Angelo's tuition at the University of Pisa was likewise sponsored by Lorenzo de' Medici.
- Giovanni de' Medici: second son of Lorenzo de' Medici, he is the leader of the florentine group of students and although still young he is already a candidate for the cardinal's purple, for this reason he's always called Eminence. He is the future Pope Leo X.
- Girolamo Savonarola: An Italian Dominican priest who harbors great enmity toward the Medicis and the Borgias.

== Media ==
=== Manga ===
Cesare was written and illustrated by Fuyumi Soryo and supervised by Dante scholar Motoaki Hara. The manga premiered in the No. 17 issue of Kodansha's seinen (young men's) manga magazine Morning in March 24, 2005. It was serialized irregularly and, at one point, went on a four-year hiatus that lasted from October 2014 to November 15, 2018. The manga ended after 16 years of serialization in the No. 52 issue of Morning on November 25, 2021. Its chapters were collected into 13 tankōbon (compiled volumes) published by Kodansha's KC Deluxe imprint from October 23, 2006, to January 21, 2022. Cesare has also been published in Italian by Star Comics and French by Ki-oon.

A side story manga, titled Canzoniere, was serialized on the Morning Two website from February 27, to June 5, 2025.

==== Volume list ====
| No. | Japanese release date | Japanese ISBN |
|---|---|---|
| 1 | October 23, 2006 | 978-4-06-372201-7 |
| 2 | October 23, 2006 | 978-4-06-372202-4 |
| 3 | April 23, 2007 | 978-4-06-372287-1 |
| 4 | November 22, 2007 | 978-4-06-372396-0 |
| 5 | July 23, 2008 | 978-4-06-375523-7 |
| 6 | November 21, 2008 | 978-4-06-375604-3 |
| 7 | August 21, 2009 | 978-4-06-375750-7 |
| 8 | October 22, 2010 | 978-4-06-375987-7 |
| 9 | April 23, 2012 | 978-4-06-376629-5 |
| 10 | March 22, 2013 | 978-4-06-376795-7 |
| 11 | January 23, 2015 | 978-4-06-377119-0 (standard edition); 978-4-06-362289-8 (limited edition) |
| 12 | June 21, 2019 | 978-4-06-515092-4 |
| 13 | January 21, 2022 | 978-4-06-526449-2 |

==== Canzoniere ====
| No. | Japanese release date | Japanese ISBN |
|---|---|---|
| 1 | July 23, 2025 | 978-4-06-540042-5 |

=== Stage musical ===
On June 14, 2019, Kodansha announced a stage musical adaptation of the manga directed by Yūna Koyama, with a script written by Kōichi Ogita and a score composed by Ken Shima. The musical's cast included Akinori Nakagawa as Cesare Borgia, Shuntarō Miyao as Miguel da Corella, Ryo Matsuda and Taiki Yamazaki (double cast) as Angelo da Canossa, Tetsuya Bessho as Rodrigo Borgia, Kōjirō Oka as Giuliano della Rovere, Haruki Kiyama as Raffaele Riario, Takuya Kon as Lorenzo de' Medici, Masaaki Fujioka as Dante Alighieri, and Daisuke Yokoyama as the Holy Roman Emperor Henry VII, among others. The musical was originally scheduled to run at the Meiji-za theater in Tokyo from April 13 to May 11, 2020. However, on April 8, 2020, the production canceled all shows due to the COVID-19 pandemic. Nakagawa hosted a 90-minute concert at the Meiji-za on July 11 and July 12, 2020, after the theater re-opened. The concert featured six songs from the Cesare musical and other songs from Nakagawa's career. The musical was finally performed in 2023, with some cast changes. The 2023 performances featured Kenchi Tachibana as Miguel da Corella. Ryotaro Akazawa replaced Matsuda as Angelo da Canossa, but Yamazaki did return.

=== Other media ===
Kodansha launched a multilingual Cesare website called Cesare Academia on April 27, 2013. The website featured video interviews with Fuyumi Soryo; behind-the-scenes information about the manga's production; and a user-edited wiki called Cesarepedia, a portmanteau of "Cesare" and "Wikipedia", with entries on historical figures and events. It was discontinued on September 30, 2014.

Kodansha also published a guidebook titled Cesare Borgia o Shitteimasu ka? (チェーザレ・ボルジアを知っていますか？, Chēzare Borujia o Shitteimasu ka?; "Do You Know Cesare Borgia?") on August 29, 2013. Supervised by Soryo and Motoaki Hara, the book introduces readers to Italian history and culture during the Renaissance. It also contains an Italy travel guide and a summary of the Cesare manga's first ten volumes.

== Reception ==
The manga had over 1.4 million copies in circulation by 2019. Cesare was nominated for the Best Comic award at the 41st Angoulême International Comics Festival in 2014. It has been nominated for the 27th Tezuka Osamu Cultural Prize in 2023.

== See also ==
- Cantarella, another manga series about Cesare Borgia's early life
