= Boyfriend (manga) =

Japanese manga series

- Cover of the first tankōbon volume

ボーイフレンド (Bōifurendo)
- Genre: Romance
- Manga
- Written by: Fuyumi Soryo
- Published by: Shogakukan
- Magazine: Shōjo Comic
- Original run: November 26, 1985 – April 23, 1988
- Volumes: 10
- Anime television film
- Directed by: Satoshi Dezaki
- Written by: Kazumi Koide
- Studio: Magic Bus
- Original network: TV Tokyo
- Released: February 11, 1992
- Runtime: 114 minutes

Boyfriend (Japanese: ボーイフレンド, Hepburn: Bōifurendo) is a Japanese manga series written and illustrated by Fuyumi Soryo. The story focuses on the developing relationship between Masaki, a delinquent and former basketball star, and Kanako, a girl with a heart condition that forces her to repeat two years of school.

In 1987, Boyfriend received the 33rd Shogakukan Manga Award for shōjo manga. On February 11, 1992, an anime adaptation produced by Magic Bus aired on TV Tokyo. In 2008, the manga was posted on Yahoo! Comic Japan's website for free browsing, in order to celebrate Shōjo Comic magazine's 40th anniversary.

== Plot ==
Masaki Takatō is the second youngest of four sons, and seemingly a delinquent by nature. His hot temper has put a wedge between himself and his strict father, gotten him kicked out of one school, and tossed in another school which is notoriously horrible for the one thing he's truly good at—basketball. A chance encounter with the willful Kanako Yūki may serve as a catalyst for change, as the indefinable connection she feels with Masaki draws them together...

== Characters ==
- Masaki Takatō (高刀 柾, Takatō Masaki)
- Kanako Yūki (結城 可奈子, Yūki Kanako)
- Sō Nakatsugawa (仲津川 荘, Nakatsugawa Sō)
- Akira Sofue (曽笛 亜樹良, Sofue Akira)
- Tadashi Takatō (高刀 正, Takatō Tadashi)
- Masao Takatō (高刀 正雄, Takatō Masao)
- Masahiko Takatō (高刀 正彦, Takatō Masahiko)
- Miwako Takatō (高刀 美和子, Takatō Miwako)
- Misako Tanaka (田中 美智子, Tanaka Misako)
- Koga (古賀)
- Aki Togawa (戸川 亜季, Togawa Aki)
- Megumi Hanyū (羽生 恵, Hanyū Megumi)
- Mami Hayashino (林野 まみ, Hayashino Mami)
- Tōru Ogi (尾木 透, Ogi Tōru)
- Ōba (大場)
- Saeko Sofue (曽笛 冴子, Sofue Saeko)
