= Shiroh =

- Music: Tsukasa Okazaki
- Lyrics: Demon Kogure; Hideaki Yamano; Kazuki Nakashima; Hidenori Inoue
- Book: Kazuki Nakashima
- Basis: Rock musical
- Productions: 2004 Tokyo, Japan; 2004 Osaka, Japan

Shiroh is a rock musical by Hidenori Inoue and Kazuki Nakashima.

== Cast ==
- Shiroh as Akinori Nakagawa
- Matsuda Shiroh Tokisada as Takaya Kamikawa
- Yamada Juan as Yumiko Takahashi
- O-Fuku as Kyoko
- Rio as Chihiro Otsuka
- O-Kou as Shoko Takada
- Yagyū Jūbei Mitsuyoshi as Jun Takada
- Masuda Jinbe as Jun Uemoto
- Miyake Kurodo as Makoto Kurine
- Itakura Shigemasa as Keigo Yoshino
- Zenza as Yohei Izumi
- Tsuyazakimondo as Narushi Ikeda
- O-Mitsu as Natsuko Akiyama
- Matsudaira Nobutsuna as Toru Emori

== Characters ==
Character	Description
Shiroh	A boy who has a miraculous voice.
Matsuda Shiroh Tokisada	Matsuda Shiroh Tokisada had miraculous power, but he lost the power after one incident.
Yamada Juan	A painter.
Masuda Jinbe	Father of Matsuda Shiroh Tokisada.
O-Fuku	Sister of Matsuda Shiroh Tokisada.
Rio	A girl who Shiroh and Matsuda Shiroh Tokisada can see.
O-Kou	Sister of O-Mitsu.
Yagyū Jūbei Mitsuyoshi	A great swordsman who seeks Matsuda Shiroh Tokisada's life.

== DVD ==
Shiroh Live film DVD
- Written by: Kazuki Nakashima
- Starring: Akinori Nakagawa; Takaya Kamikawa; Yumiko Takahashi
- Release date: October 5, 2005
- Running time: 195 minutes + 50 minutes
- Country: Japan
- Language: Japanese

Shiroh (DVD) was released on October 5, 2005.

- Shiroh (2005) 195min + 50min
