= Seru no Koi =

Single by Akinori Nakagawa
- Released: August 17, 2005
- Genre: J-pop
- Length: 4:24
- Label: Tokuma Japan
- Songwriter(s): Mekete

Akinori Nakagawa singles chronology
"Matador" (2004)	"Seru no Koi" (2005)	"Owaranai Christmas" (2007)

"Seru no Koi" (セルの恋) is Akinori Nakagawa's fifth single, released in 2005. The single was written by Mekete. It aired on the intersital music program Minna no Uta on TV from August 2005 to September 2005 on NHK. The animation was created by Kunio Katō who is the winner of the 2009 Academy Award for Best Animated Short Film at the 81st Academy Awards.

== Track listing ==
No.	Title	Length
1.	"Seru no Koi (セルの恋)"	4:24
2.	"Mayonaka no Carnival (真夜中のカーニバル)"	4:27
3.	"Sabaku (砂漠)"	4:49
4.	"Seru no Koi (セルの恋) (Mina no Uta version)"	4:48
5.	"Seru no Koi (セルの恋) (Instrumental version)"	4:21
