= ES (Eternal Sabbath) =

Manga

- First tankōbon volume cover, featuring Ryosuke Akiba
- Manga
- Written by: Fuyumi Soryo
- Published by: Kodansha
- English publisher: NA: Del Rey Manga
- Imprint: Morning KC
- Magazine: Morning
- Original run: August 23, 2001 – October 7, 2004
- Volumes: 8
- icon

ES (Eternal Sabbath), also known simply as ES, is a Japanese manga series written and illustrated by Fuyumi Soryo. It was serialized in Kodansha's seinen manga magazine Morning from August 2001 to October 2004, with its chapters compiled in eight tankōbon volumes.

== Synopsis ==
ES (Eternal Sabbath) is a gene developed by a group of scientists who sought immortality. The presence of the gene grants the carrier up to 200 years of life immune from all viruses. Though the scientists' original intention was to demonstrate the feasibility of eternal life, ES unexpectedly has the additional power of mind-control and memory-alteration.

A female neurology professor, Mine Kujo, meets a man by the name of Ryosuke Akiba and discovers that he is a genetically engineered human with the ES gene. Together, they pursue a more dangerous ES-carrier who had escaped from the research center.

== Characters ==
Ryosuke Akiba (秋庭 亮介, Akiba Ryosuke)
Actual name is ES00 or "Shuro", named after the palm leaves in the bible. In Catholicism, a cross applied to the forehead with the ashes of shuro leaves a sign of repentance. Perhaps this name was borne of the researchers' feelings of guilt for playing God and creating a human being; he is a genetically engineered human, made by the National Hygienic Laboratory. Though unexpected by the research staff, he was born with a power to "hack" into other people's minds, save for a few. The ES gene grants him a lifeline of at least two centuries, and a flawless immunity system. "Ryosuke Akiba" is actually someone else's identity Shuro uses through his powers. The real Akiba previously died in an accident. Shuro has a slight sense of justice and morality. He eventually falls in love with Mine.
Mine Kujo (九条 未祢, Kujo Mine)
A neurological specialist from a physiology research institute from the U.S. Extremely intelligent, often scaring her "omiai" (speed-dating) partners away by speaking about the exact kind of thing you're not supposed to speak about when dating someone - the reason why alpha lions eat lion cubs, ray mantas' mysterious and exciting way of procreating, that sort of things. She isn't quite the regular woman you meet every day - though she could be called a beauty if you look closely, she is more the type of woman who's talking, when not screaming to herself. She is qualified by Shuro as a "dense woman", in that she is one of the very rare humans whose minds cannot be totally invaded and controlled by the powers of an ES; mindspeaking and (painful) hallucinations are as far as it goes.
Izaku (イザク)
Shuro's clone, created to investigate why ES00 was the only one to survive, since Shuro was the original ES. Created 10 years after Shuro's birth, his code name is ES01. He grew in a mechanical womb during approximately five years. Any light or sound would be kept from reaching him in order to avoid the "rise of sentience"; the researchers planned on dissecting him to study his viscera right after taking him out of the mechanical womb. His name originates from the Old Testament; the devout Abraham offered his son Isaac as a sacrifice to God.
Like his namesake, Izaku was born to be sacrificed.
Shinichiro Sakaki (榊 晋一郎, Sakaki Shinichiro)
Used to be an immunology researcher at National Medical Research Center. Another person Akiba can't manipulate.
Yuri Iwamura (岩村 有里, Iwamura Yuri)
Friend of Izaku. Like Izaku, Yuri-chan has an infantile sense of right and wrong, and is complacent and encouraging in Izaku's killing. She is also a victim of child abuse at the hands of her mother.

== Organizations ==
National Hygienic Laboratory: Supposedly studying gene therapy and immunity for cancer cells. Their true purpose was to find the secret to immortality. When they found a unique gene with an improved immune system, their goal was to create a life form from it.

== Publication ==
Written and illustrated by Fuyumi Soryo, ES was serialized in Kodansha's seinen manga magazine Morning from August 23, 2001, in that year's 38th issue, to October 7, 2004, in that year's 45th issue. Its chapters were compiled in eight tankōbon volumes, released from February 22, 2002, to November 22, 2004. In October 2005, Del Rey Manga picked up the series for English distribution, with the first volume to release in June 2006. Del Rey Manga would release all eight volumes of the series from May 30, 2006, to February 26, 2008.

=== Volumes ===
No.	Release date	ISBN
1	February 22, 2002	978-4-06-328801-8
2	August 23, 2002	978-4-06-328837-7
3	February 21, 2003	978-4-06-328866-7
4	July 23, 2003	978-4-06-328897-1
5	January 23, 2004	978-4-06-328928-2
6	May 21, 2004	978-4-06-328954-1
7	August 23, 2004	978-4-06-328976-3
8	November 22, 2004	978-4-06-328995-4
