= Coming of Age (disambiguation) =

Coming of age is a young person's formal transition from adolescence to adulthood.

Coming of Age may also refer to:

== Film and television ==
- Coming of Age (1938 film), a British film by H. Manning Haynes
- Coming of Age (1984 film), an Australian film
- Coming of Age (1993 film), a Canadian television film
- Coming of Age (2015 film), a South African film
- Coming of Age (American TV series), a sitcom aired from 1988 to 1989
- Coming of Age (British TV series), a sitcom aired from 2007 to 2011
- "Coming of Age" (Degrassi: The Next Generation)
- "Coming of Age" (Merseybeat)
- "Coming of Age" (Star Trek: The Next Generation)

== Music ==
- Coming of Age (group), a 1990s American R&B group

=== Albums ===
- Coming of Age (Breaking Point album), 2001
- Coming of Age (Five Man Electrical Band album), 1972
- Coming of Age (Jude Johnstone album), 2002
- Coming of Age (Memphis Bleek album), 1999
- Coming of Age, a live album by Camel, 1998
- A Coming of Age, by Lucky Soul, 2010
- Come of Age, by The Vaccines, 2012

=== Songs ===
- "Coming of Age" (song), by Foster the People from Supermodel, 2014
- "Coming of Age", by Any Trouble as the B-side of "Open Fire", 1984
- "Coming of Age", by Camel from Harbour of Tears, 1996
- "Coming of Age", by Damn Yankees from Damn Yankees, 1990
- "Coming of Age", by Dodie Stevens as the B-side of "Pink Shoe Laces", 1959
- "Coming of Age", by Five Man Electrical Band, B-side of "The Devil And Miss Lucy", 1972
- "Coming of Age", by Jay-Z from Reasonable Doubt, 1996
- "Coming of Age", by Maisie Peters from The Good Witch, 2023

== Other uses ==
- Coming-of-age story, a work of fiction about coming of age
- The Coming of Age (book), a 1970 book by Simone de Beauvoir
- Coming of Age (book), a 1999 photographic art book by Will McBride
- Coming of Age in Samoa, a 1928 book by Margaret Mead
- Coming of Age (Unitarian Universalism), a program within Unitarian Universalist congregations

== See also ==
- Legal age
- Coming-of-age story, a literature and film genre
