= Coming of Age (2015 film) =

2015 German-South African documentary drama film

- Directed by: Teboho Edkins
- Written by: Teboho Edkins
- Produced by: Teboho Edkins; Don Edkins
- Cinematography: Samuel Lahu
- Edited by: Rune Schweitzer
- Music by: Retabile Putsoane
- Production companies: Deutsche Film- und Fernsehakademie Berlin (DFFB); Steps International
- Distributed by: MAGNETFILM GmbH
- Release date: 28 February 2015; (Germany)
- Running time: 63 minutes
- Countries: South Africa; Germany; Lesotho
- Language: Sotho

Coming of Age is a 2015 German-South African-Mosotho documentary drama film directed by Teboho Edkins and co-produced by Don Edkins for Steps and Teboho Edkins for Deutsche Film-und Fernsehakademie Berlin (dffb). The film revolves around four Basotho teenagers: Lefa, Senate, Retabile and Mosaku; over the course of two years as they grow up in the village of Ha Sekake.

The film made its premier in February 2015 in Germany. The film received mixed reviews from critics and screened at many film festivals. In 2015, the director won the Biberstein Gusmao Award for the Best Emerging Director at the 2015 Porto/Post/Doc. At the 2015 Berlin International Film Festival, the film was nominated for the Crystal Bear Award for the Generation 14plus - Best Film. In the same year, the film was nominated for the Tanit d'Or for the Documentary Feature Film Carthage Film Festival. In 2016 the film was again nominated for the EVA - Excellence in Visual Anthropology Award at the Ethnocineca.
