= Shinji Harada =

Japanese singer-songwriter (1958-)

Shinji Harada (Harada Shinji、原田真二) is a pop music artist in Japan. He was born on December 5, 1958 in Hiroshima.

After three years of practicing guitar, at the age of fifteen he was ready to play guitar with the band Yamaha.

Harada became a musical sensation in Japan when he released his debut single Teens' Blues on October 25, 1977 when he was 18 years old. He released two more singles, Candy in November and Shadow Boxer in December same year. All three singles ranked within the top 20 in the Oricon chart simultaneously, which had never happened before. The debut album Feel Happy was to become number one in the first week of release in Japan in 1978. A documentary film about him, Our Song, was made in 1978. Harada has been prolific, releasing more than 70 singles from 1977 to 2015.

Harada as a songwriter, has written or composed for Koji Kikkawa, Junko Yagami, Anri, Hiromi Go, Akina Nakamori, and other artists.

His song 'Time Travell' from the album 'Feel Happy' was covered by Spitz. Spitz's 'Time Travel' was used in the famous 2011 Japanese drama Boku to Star no 99 Nichi starring Hidetoshi Nishijima and Kim Tae Hee.

== Discography ==
- Feel Happy (1978)
- Natural High (1979)
- The Best Collection (1980)
- Entrance (1981)
- Light Collection (1983)
- Save Our Soul (1983.7.21)
- Modern Vision (1984)
- Magical Healing (1985)
- Doing Wonders (1986)
- Urban game (1988.11.21)
- Absolute Singles (1988)
- Absolute Mix (1988)
- Just Urban Night (1989)
- Kindness (1991)
- Miracle Love (1992.11.21)
- Make it a Paradise (1993.9.21) COLUMBIA
- The World of Shinji Harada (1998)
- Urban Angels 2004 (2004.12.5) Shine Records
- Harmoney～Bokurano Harmony～(mini album) (2005.10.25)
- Feel Happy 〜Debut 30th Anniversary〜 (2007.10.24) FORLIFE
- Feel Free (2007) Roppongi WAVE
