= I Will Get Your Kiss =

Single by Akinori Nakagawa

from the album Akinori Nakagawa
- Released: 2001
- Recorded: August 1, 2001
- Genre: J-pop
- Length: 4:59
- Songwriter: Akinori Nakagawa

Akinori Nakagawa singles chronology
"I Will Get Your Kiss" (2001)	"I Say Good-bye" (2001)

"I Will Get Your Kiss" is a song written by Japanese singer-songwriter Akinori Nakagawa as his debut single. It was released on August 1, 2010 by Tokuma Japan. It was the theme song of the Japanese TV drama Maria.

== Track listing ==
No.	Title	Length
1.	"I Will Get Your Kiss"	4:59
2.	"Catch Fire"	4:40
3.	"Futa-tsu, Hito-tsu Futa-tsu, Hito-tsu (フタツ、ヒトツ Futa-tu, Hito-tu)"	6:18
4.	"I Will Get Your Kiss Instrumental"	4:59
