= I Say Good-bye =

Single by Akinori Nakagawa
- Released: 2001
- Recorded: November 7, 2001
- Genre: R&B, soul
- Length: 4:59
- Songwriter: Akinori Nakagawa

Akinori Nakagawa singles chronology
"I Will Get Your Kiss" (2001)	"I Say Good-bye" (2001)	"White Shiny Street" (2002)

"I Say Good-bye" is a song written by Akinori Nakagawa and the theme song of the Japanese TV drama Saigo no Kazoku.

== Track listing ==
No.	Title	Length
1.	"I Say Good-bye"	4:59
2.	"Brand"	3:59
3.	"So sorry"	5:01
4.	"I Say Good-bye Instrumental"	5:08
