= Meiji-za =

Theatre in Chūō, Tokyo, Japan

- 明治座
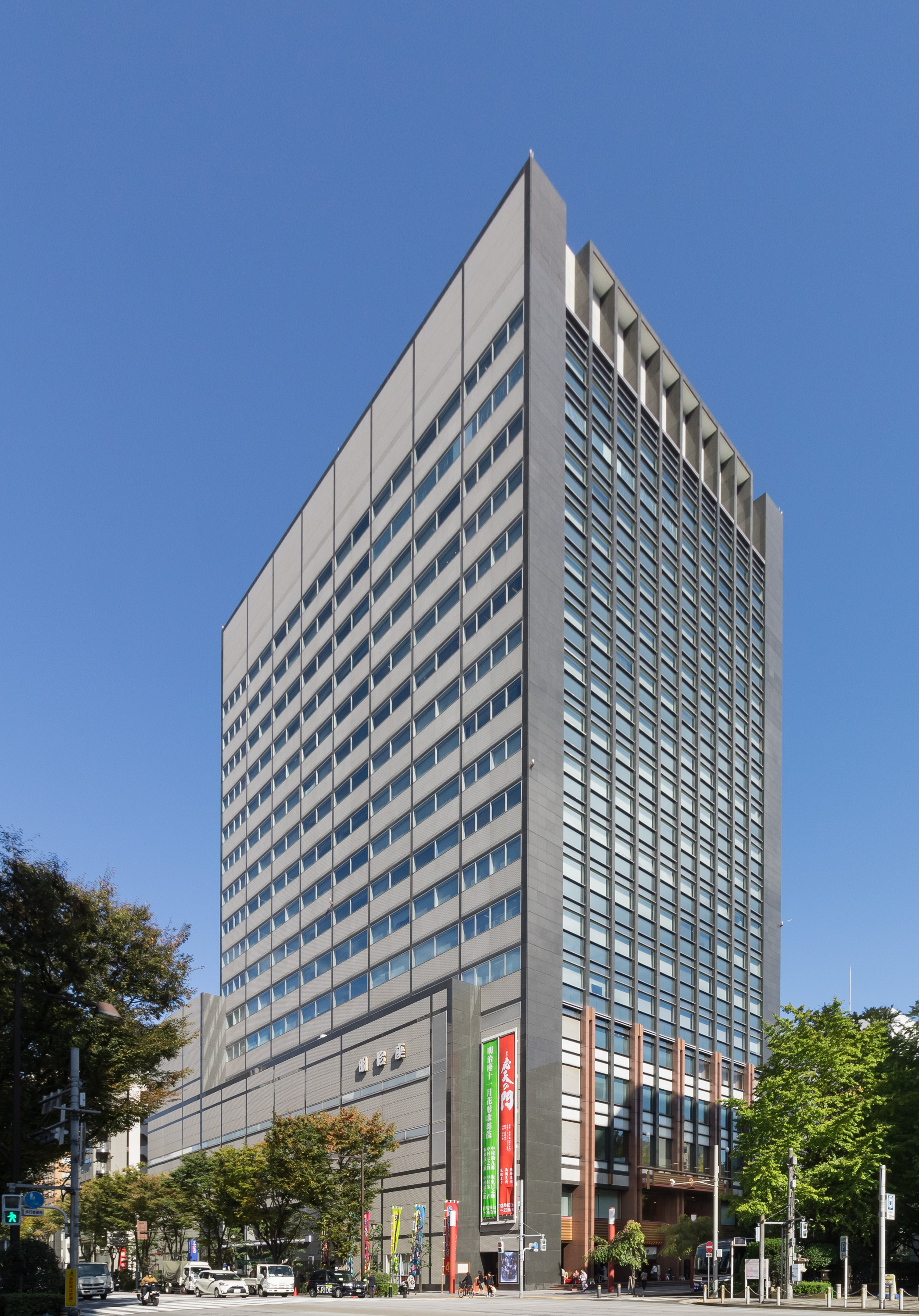
- Meiji-za
- Interactive map of Meiji-za
- Address: 東京都中央区日本橋浜町二丁目31番1号; 2-31-1 Nihonbashi-Hamacho, Chūō-ku; Tokyo; Japan
- Coordinates: 35.687967°N 139.78688°E
- Owner: Meiji-za Corporation
- Capacity: 1,368
- Type: Kabuki theater

Construction
- Opened: 1873
- Rebuilt: 1885, 1928, 1950, 1958, 1993

Website
- www.meijiza.co.jp (in Japanese)

The Meiji-za (明治座, "Meiji Theatre") is a theatre in Chūō, Tokyo, Japan. It was originally constructed in 1873. It presents kabuki and Western stage plays.

== History ==
The theatre first opened in the district of Hisamatsu-chô as the Kishô-za in 1873. Six years later it reopened under the name of Hisamatsu-za. In February 1885, it opened under a third name, Chitose-za, but burned down in 1890. In November 1893, it was rebuilt as the Meiji-za, the name that it holds today.

In 1904, the Meiji-za underwent renovations, only to be burned down in the 1923 Great Kantō earthquake. Until the Meiji-za was rebuilt in Hama-chô, the Suehiro-za, a small theater in the Azabu Jûban district, served as a temporary replacement. The Meiji-za was burned down in the bombings of World War II, but reopened in December 1950. After a fire in 1957, it was reopened the next year.

The Meiji-za put on two especially grand kabuki performances in March and April 1993 to celebrate three years of extensive renovations.

In 2023, the Meija-za opened its 150th anniversary season with its first ever original musical, CESARE ~ Creator of Destruction ~, based on Fuyumi Soryo's manga of the same name. For this production, an orchestra pit was created there for the first time in the theatre's history.
