= Chinka =

Chinka may refer to:

- Chinka, a mythological figure in Laz, Mingrelian and Georgian mythology
- Chinka, Greece, a village in Ioannina, Greece
- Chinka, a village in Kardzhali Province, Bulgaria, made up of Malka Chinka and Golyama Chinka

== See also ==
- CHINCA, China International Contractors Association
- Shinca (disambiguation)
