= Akinori Nakagawa =

Japanese singer, songwriter and actor (born 1982)

- Born: Akinori Nakagawa; 5 November 1982 (age 44); Sendai, Japan
- Genres: Pop, R&B
- Occupations: Singer-songwriter, actor
- Years active: 2001–present
- Website: Official website

Akinori Nakagawa (中川 晃教, Nakagawa Akinori; born 5 November 1982, in Sendai) is a Japanese singer, songwriter and actor. In 2001, he debuted as a singer with "I Will Get Your Kiss". In 2002, he appeared in the musical Mozart!, in which he played the leading role and received a Rookie of the Year Award in the drama division at the 57th National Arts Festival held by the Agency of Cultural Affairs, Government of Japan. His performance in the same musical also earned him the Haruko Sugimura Award and an award nomination for best actor in the 10th Yomiuri Drama Awards. Since then, he has performed in a number of musicals while still actively pursuing his musical career.

== Biography ==
=== Early life ===
Akinori Nakagawa was born in 1982 and raised in Sendai, Miyagi. He began to learn classical piano while in kindergarten.

In 1997, he participated a music contest named "Teens Music Festival" hosted by Yamaha in Tohoku region and he became the youngest prize winner. He would have advanced the National contest, but the song he sang was not his own song, so he could not enter it. In 1998, he participated the contest with his sister again and he advanced to the National contest and took a second place of the contest.

=== Music career ===
Akinori Nakagawa and his sister's appearance on the TV documentary program was decided after the parent of his classmate, TV producer, watched his and his sister singing songs at the school festival.

On 1 August 2001, Akinori Nakagawa debuted with his first single, "I Will Get Your Kiss". The song was used as the theme song in the Japanese TV drama Maria, and sold over 200,000 copies. In 2004, he made his album debut in Taiwan.

== Discography ==
Akinori Nakagawa discography
- Studio albums: 4
- Soundtrack albums: 2
- Compilation albums: 1
- Singles: 6
- Music videos: 6
- DVDs: 6

=== Studio albums ===
Year	Title	Release date
2001	Akinori Nakagawa	5 December 2001
2004	Himself	17 March 2004
2005	Oasis	25 May 2005
2005	Sabaku	22 June 2005

=== Compilation albums ===
Year	Title	Release date
2006	Akinori Nakagawa 2001-2005	22 February 2006

=== Soundtracks (Cast recording) ===
Year	Title	Release date
2005	Mozart! – Cast recording	1 December 2005
2005	Shiroh – Cast recording	

=== Singles ===
Year	Title	Release date
2001	"I Will Get Your Kiss"	1 August 2001
2001	"I Say Good-bye"	7 November 2001
2002	"White Shiny Street"	29 May 2002
2004	"Matador"	7 January 2004
2005	"Seru no Koi"	17 August 2005
2007	"Owaranai Christmas"	21 November 2007

=== Music videos ===
Year	Title	Release date
2004	Akinori Nakagawa Concert 2003 Matador	28 July 2004
2007	Shinka-ron	20 June 2007
2010	Skin vs Shampoo	20 July 2010
2010	Owaranai Christmas	20 August 2010
2010	Ongaku ga kierukoto no nai Dance Floor	20 September 2010
2010	Ongaku ga Kierukoto no nai Dance Floor in Akasaka Blitz	8 December 2010

=== DVDs (Live on stage DVD) ===
Year	Title	Release date
2005	Candide	9 October 2005
2007	Shiroh	30 November 2007
2011	Samurai 7	6 April 2011
2011	X day	13 May 2011
2012	Legend of the Galactic Heroes "Jiyū Wakusei Dōmei"	20 July 2012
2012	Legend of the Galactic Heroes "Gekitsui-ō"	2 November 2012
2020	Frankenstein	18 September 2020
2023	Cesare: Il Creatore che ha distrutto	28 September 2023
2023	The Devil	October 2023

== Tours and concerts ==
Year	Title	Duration	Number of performances
2003	Akinori Nakagawa First Live 2003 Tour	10 April – 15 May 2003	3
10 April: Shibuya Club Quattro (Tokyo), 15 May: Shinsaibashi Club Quattro (Osaka)
2003	Street Club Zone 2nd "It's Show Time"	29–31 July 2003	2
29 July: Rihga Royal Hotel (Osaka), 31 July: Grand Prince Hotel Akasaka (Tokyo)
2003	Akinori Nakagawa Concert 2003 Matador	20 December 2003	1
20 December Nakano Sun Plaza (Tokyo)
2003	Taipei First Live	29 January 2005	1
29 January: Red Play House (Taipei)
2005	Nakagawa Akinori Live Tour Code: 2005 Sabaku/Oasis	19–23 December 2005	4
19–20 December: Shibuya Club Quattro (Tokyo), 22 December: Fukuoka Drum Be-1 (Fukuoka), 23 December: Shinsaibashi Club Quattro (Osaka)
2006	Live Act "BLUE DREAM"	22 November – 13 December 2006	9
22–26 November: Setagaya Public Theater(Tokyo), 11 December: Chunichi Theatre (Aichi), 12–13 December: Shinkobe Oriental Theater
2007	Lukas Perman × Akinori Nakagawa Concert	30 May – 8 June 2007	3
30–31 May: Umeda Arts Theater(Osaka), 8 June: Shibuya C. C. Lemon Hall (Tokyo)
2008	Akinori Nakagawa Concert 2008 Owaranai Christmas	13–28 March 2008	6
13–14 March: Nakano Sun Plaza (Tokyo), 24–25 March: Osaka Kousei Nenkin Kaikan (Osaka), 27–28 March: Aichi Kosei Nenkin Kaikan (Aichi)
2008	Shampoo	17 June – 5 October 2008	3
17 June: STB139 (Tokyo), 5 October: Harajuku Quest Hall (Tokyo)
2008	Bob	21 September – 8 November 2008	3
21 September: STB139 (Tokyo), 14 October: Harajuku Quest Hall (Tokyo), 8 November: Ikebukuro Amlux Hall (Tokyo)
2008	Akinori Nakagawa Live tour 2008 Skin	18 November – 9 December 2008	4
18 November: Nagoya Ell. Fits All (Aichi), 19–20 November: Knave (Osaka), 9 December: Akasaka Blitz (Tokyo)
2009	Concert 2009 The Life is Contact	26 April 2009	1
26 April: Akasaka Blitz (Tokyo)
2009	House!	6 September 2009	2
6 September: STB139 (Tokyo)
2009	Akinori Nakagawa Plugless Concert 2009	20 November – 26 December 2009	4
20–21 November 26 December: Hakuju Hall (Tokyo)
2010	Tea 4 every 1	7 February 2010	2
7 February: STB139 (Tokyo)
2010	Tokyo Bunka Kaikan Popular week 2010	25 February 2010	1
25 February: Tokyo Bunka Kaikan(Tokyo)
2010	Akinori Nakagawa Meets Aoyama Gakuin	13 March 2010	1
13 March: Aoyama Gakuin University(Tokyo)
2010	Kentetsu Kou * Akinori Nakagawa Ikiru Recipe	20 March 2010	2
20 March: STB139 (Tokyo)
2010	Akinori Nakagawa Concert 2010 "Ongaku ga Kierukoto no nai Dance Floor"	15 May – 22 October 2010	6
15 May: Shibuya-AX (Tokyo), 10 October: Akasaka Blitz (Tokyo), 21 October: Nagoya Blue Note (Aichi), 22 October: Billboard Live Osaka (Osaka)
2010	Akinori Nakagawa Concert 2010 Hakuju Hall	24 December 2010	1
24 December: Hakuju Hall (Tokyo)
2011	Tokyo Bunka Kaikan Popular week 2011	17 February 2011	1
17 February: Tokyo Bunka Kaikan (Tokyo)
2011	Akinori Nakagawa Live 2011	23 February – 30 April 2011	6
23 February: Cotton Club (Tokyo), 28 April: Nagoya Blue Note (Aichi), 30 April: Billboard Live Osaka (Osaka)
2011	Akinori Nakagawa "Love for Japan"	1 May 2011	2
1 May: Cotton Club (Tokyo)
2011	Akinori Nakagawa 10th anniversary concert "Yellow", "Black", "White"	9–11 September 2011	3
9 September:Theater BRAVA!(Osaka), 10–11 September: Akasaka Blitz (Tokyo)
2011	Akinori Nakagawa concert 2011 Owaranai Christmas	22 December 2011	2
22 December: Billboard Live Osaka (Osaka)
2011	Akinori Nakagawa concert 2011 "The Wiz"	24–26 December 2011	4
24 December 26 December: Hakuju Hall (Tokyo)
2012	Tokyo Bunka Kaikan Popular week 2012	16 February 2012	1
16 February: Tokyo Bunka Kaikan (Tokyo)
2012	Akinori Nakagawa Concert 2012 Hakuju Hall	17 March 2012	2
17 March: Hakuju Hall (Tokyo)
2012	Akinori Nakagawa Live 2012 Nagoya Blue Note	26 May 2012	2
26 May: Nagoya Blue Note (Aichi)
2012	Akinori Nakagawa Live 2012 in Osaka "PopChic"	18 August 2012	2
18 August: Billboard Live Osaka (Osaka)
2012	Akinori Nakagawa Concert 2012 in Hakuju Hall vol.2	22–23 September 2012	4
22–23 September: Hakuju Hall (Tokyo)

== Works ==
=== Stage ===
Year	Title	Role	Notes
2002	Mozart!	Wolfgang Mozart	Main role
2003	Pure Love	Jun	Main role
2004	Candide	Candide	Main role
2004	himself	Hamlet	Main role
2004	Shiroh	Shiroh	Main role
2005	Mozart!	Wolfgang Mozart	Main role
2006	Our House	Joe	Main role
2007	The Who's Tommy	Tommy	Main role
2007	Eréndira	Ulises	Main role
2007	Mozart!	Wolfgang Mozart	Main role
2008	Love Letters	Andrew Makepeace Ladd, III	
2009	Saiyuki (西遊記) (Super Monkey)	Sun Wukong	Cancelled
2009	Onna Nobunaga	Mitsuhide Akechi	
2009	7Days Judgement	Akutsu Shinji	
2010	Songoku vs Songoku	Xuanzang	Beijing opera
2010	Watashi no Atama no naka no Keshigomu	Takahara Kōsuke	
2010	X day	Seiji	
2010	Samurai 7	Ukyō	
2010	Love Letters	Andrew Makepeace Ladd, III	
2011	Underground Parade	D.D.	
2011	Kaze wo Musunde	Katayama Heigo	Main role
2011	Gegege no ge – ōma ga toki ni Yureru Buranko	Kitarō	
2011	I Love You, You're Perfect, Now Change		
2011	Love Letters at Sixty		
2012	Chess in Concert	Freddie	
2012	Samurai 7	Ukyō	
2012	Legend of the Galactic Heroes "Jiyū Wakusei Dōmei"	Olivier Poplin	
2012	Miyazawa Kenji ga Tsutaerukoto		
2012	Promises, Promises in Concert	Chuck Baxter	Main role
2012	Tattoo14	Sky	
2012	Hakurai Jōtō Dōdekka	Hayashi Hirotaka	Main role
2012	Legend of the Galactic Heroes "Gekitsui-ō"	Olivier Poplin	Main role
2012	Bushi no O	Takata Gunbe	
2012	Hoshi Meguri no Uta		
2013	Mozart, l'opéra rock	Wolfgang Mozart	Main role
2016	Jersey Boys	Frankie Valli	Main role
2017	Frankenstein	Victor Frankenstein	Main role
2020	Frankenstein	Victor Frankenstein	Main role
2022	CROSS ROAD ~The Devil's Violinist Paganini~	Amduscias	Main role
2022	Jersey Boys	Frankie Valli	Main role
2023	CESARE ~ Creator of Destruction ~	Cesare Borgia	Main role
2023	The Devil	X-White	Main role
2023	Shine Show	Wakayama	Main role
2024	CROSS ROAD ~The Devil's Violinist Paganini~	Amduscias	Main role
2024	Song Writers	Peter Fox	Main role
2025	Frankenstein	Victor Frankenstein	Main role
2025	Jersey Boys	Frankie Valli	Main role

=== Television ===
Year	Title	Role	Notes
2009	Tenchijin	Hidetada Tokugawa	Taiga drama, four episodes
2009	Konkatsu Rikatsu	Shogo Kayama	NHK Television
2017	Moribito: Guardian of the Spirit	Radalle	Taiga Fantasy Drama
2024	Oddboys	Tatsunojo Kira	

== Awards and nominations ==
=== Awards ===
- All Japan Request Awards – New artist of the year – "I Will Get Your Kiss"
- National Arts Festival Award for Rookie of the Year in the drama division – Mozart!
- Haruko Sugimura Award in a Musical – Mozart!
- Yomiuri Drama Awards in a Musical – Mozart!
