= Fuyumi Soryo =

Japanese manga artist

Fuyumi Soryo 惣領冬実
- Born: January 6, 1959 (age 67) Beppu, Oita, Japan
- Area: Manga Artist
- Notable works: Boyfriend; Mars; Eternal Sabbath; Cesare
- Awards: 1988 Shogakukan Manga Award for shōjo manga

Fuyumi Soryo (惣領 冬実, Sōryō Fuyumi; born January 6, 1959) is a Japanese manga artist.

== Life ==
Soryo was born in Beppu, Oita, Japan. She is a graduate of the Oita prefectural Geijutsu Midorigaoka High School. She was born into the home of a master of the Kanze school of Noh. In her childhood she liked to draw pictures of horses and things but had no special interest in manga.

While enrolled in fashion college, she happened across Shogakukan's Rookie of the Year Contest and applied to raise money for the Sōen fashion contest. There she received an honorable mention, and subsequently made her debut as a professional manga artist with "Hidamari no Hōmonsha" ("Sunspot Visito") published in the April 1982 edition of Bessatsu Shōjo Comic. For a couple of years, she worked as an assistant for manga artist Fuyumi Ogura.

She made herself a name as a shōjo manga artist. In 1988, she was awarded the Shogakukan Manga Award for shōjo manga for Boyfriend. In 2001, she switched to mainly publishing seinen manga, working for the manga magazine Morning. Her manga series Cesare centers around the infamous Borgia family of the Italian Renaissance and Cesare Borgia himself.

Her works translated into English include Mars and ES (Eternal Sabbath).

== Works ==
Title	Year	Notes	Refs
Hidamari no Hōmonsha (陽だまりの訪問者)	1982	one-shot in Bessatsu Shōjo Comic	
Onaji Kurai Ai (おなじくらい愛)	1984–1985	serialized in Shōjo Comic published in 2 vol.	
Pink na Kimi ni Blue na Boku (ピンクなきみにブルーなぼく)	1984–1988	serialized in Ciao published in 8 vol.	
Boyfriend (ボーイフレンド)	1985–1988	serialized in Shōjo Comic published in 10 vol.	
3 – Three	1989–1992	serialized in Shōjo Comic published in 14 vol.	
Chiki Chiki Bom! (チキチキBOM!)	1989–1990	serialized in Ciao published in 2 vol.	
Kanojo ga Café ni iru (彼女がカフェにいる)	1992–1993	serialized in Bessatsu Shōjo Comic published in 6 vol.	
Doll (ドール)	1996	serialized in Bessatsu Friend published in 1 vol.	
Mars	1996–2000	serialized in Bessatsu Friend published in 15 vol.	
Mars: A Horse With No Name (MARS外伝 名前のない馬, MARS Gaiden Namae no Nai Uma)	1999	serialized in Bessatsu Friend published in 1 vol.	
ES (Eternal Sabbath)	2001–2004	serialized in Morning published in 8 vol.	
Tamara (タマラ)	2002–2004	serialized in Bessatsu Friend published in 1 vol.	
Cesare (チェーザレ)	2005–2021	serialized in Morning published in 13 vol.	
Marie Antoinette (マリー・アントワネット)	2015–2016	serialized in Morning published in 1 vol.	
