= Shinca =

Shinca may refer to:

- Shinca Entertainment, an American company
- Xinca people, an ethnic group of Mesoamerica
- Xinca language, their language(s)

== See also ==
- Șinca, a commune in Romania
- Shinka (disambiguation)
- Chinka (disambiguation)
