= China International Contractors Association =

China International Contractors Association (CHINCA), founded in April 1988 as a nationwide trade organization, has been formed voluntarily and legally by enterprises and related organizations engaging in international project contracting, manpower service and other international economic and technical cooperation. It is a nonprofit social body with corporate status, approved by the Ministry of Commerce and registered with the Ministry of Civil Affairs of the People's Republic of China. It is a member of International Chamber of Commerce China national committee.

== China Employment Agency Association ==
China Employment Agency Association is a state funded organization, a legal authority of China Ministry of Commerce to manage and issue licenses to all employment agencies related to oversea practices. https://web.archive.org/web/20151116050449/http://en.chinca.org/ is the official website of CHINCA.

== CHINCA Members' Business Scope ==
The members of CHINCA are mainly professional enterprises, corporations and international economic and technical cooperation companies which can undertake general buildings, industrial buildings, factory complexes, water supply works, sewage and environmental protection works, communication works, hazardous waste disposal works, electric power works, petrochemical works, electrommunication works and manpower supply services. Many companies also have capability for provision of various engineering consultation, feasibility study, survey, design, construction, complete sets of equipment, installation of and commissioning to equipment, guidance of production, business operation and management, technical transfer, general contracting of projects as well; such companies are able to provide workers, management and technical personnel in connection with above mentioned categories through works contracting, setting up of enterprises and production cooperation abroad; furnish different sorts of technical training; deal with import and export; establish external production and processing plants through investment abroad.

Up to now, CHINCA members have been operating in more than 180 countries and regions.
