= Byala Reka (Luda Reka tributary) =

River in Bulgaria

Byala reka
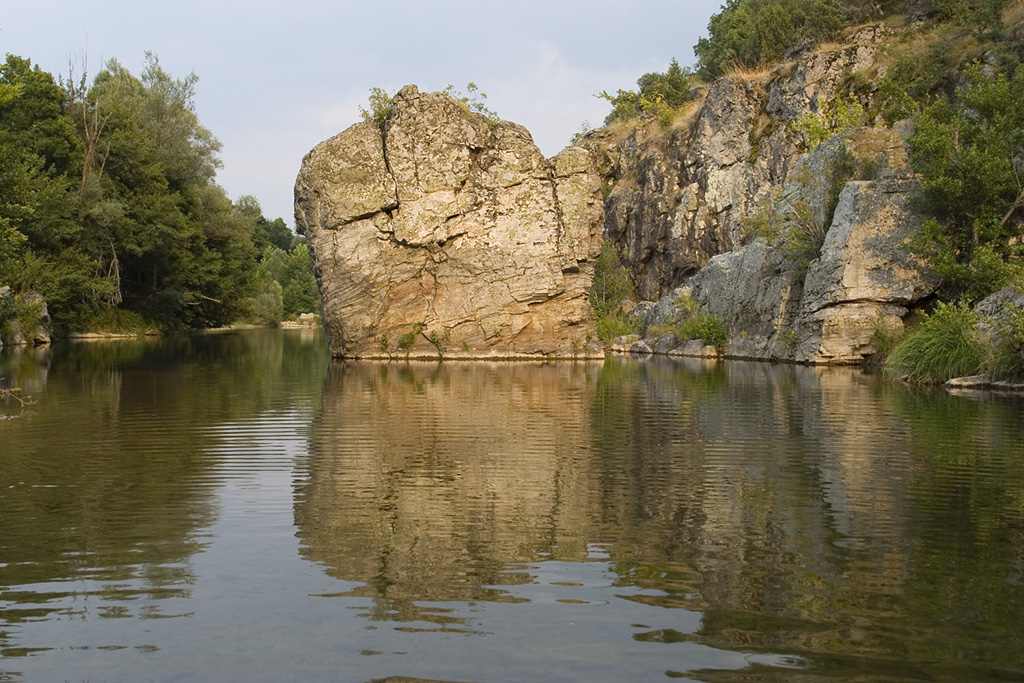

Location
- Country: Bulgaria

Physical characteristics
- Source
  - location: Maglenik Ridge, Rhodope Mountains
  - coordinates: 41°19′28.92″N 25°46′18.12″E
  - elevation: 660 m (2,170 ft)
- Mouth
  - location: Luda reka
  - coordinates: 41°26′2.04″N 26°10′30″E
  - elevation: 52 m (171 ft)
- Length: 70 km (43 mi)
- Basin size: 594 km^{2} (229 sq mi)

Basin features
- Progression: Luda reka→ Maritsa→ Aegean Sea

Byala reka (Bulgarian: Бяла река, meaning White river) is a 70 km-long river in the Rhodope Mountains of southern Bulgaria, the longest tributary of Luda reka, itself a right tributary of the Maritsa.

== Geography ==
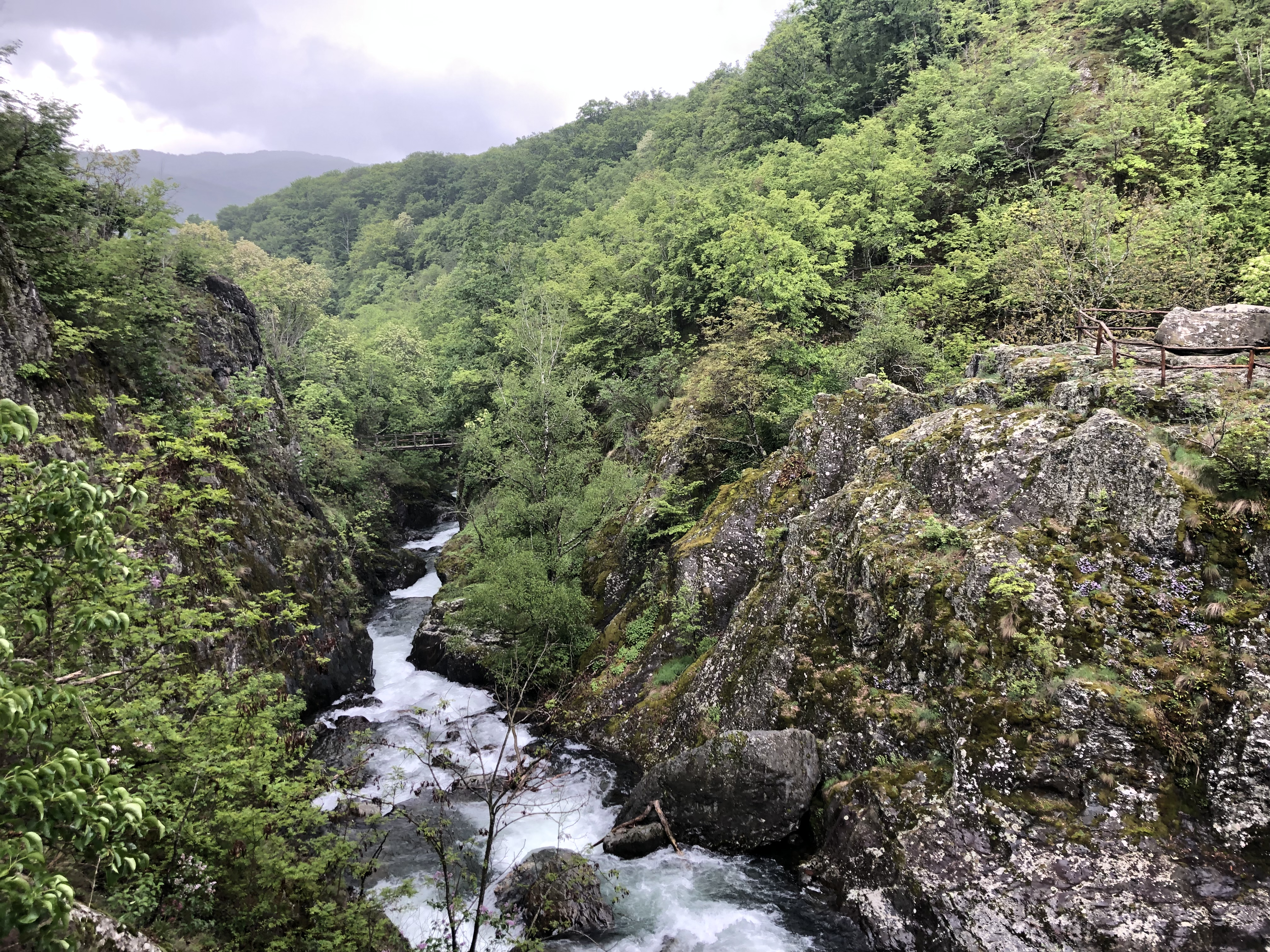
Byala reka

The Byala reka takes its source at an altitude of 980 m in the Maglenik Ridge of the eastern Rhodope Mountains very close to the Bulgaria–Greece border, some 2.2 km south of the village of Chernichevo. For the first 15 km it flows north in a deep densely forested valley between the ridges of Irantepe to the west and Cherna Planina to the east. At 3.6 km northeast of the village of Tintyava it makes a sharp bend to the southeast with an asymmetric valley with steep right slopes and slant left ones.

Near the village of Gugutka the valley widens before narrowing again, forming a section of scenic meanders with steep slopes. Downstream of Dolno Lukovo the Byala reka turns northeast and the meanders become less frequent an with a larger radius. North of the village of Mandritsa the valley widens significantly. At the village of Odrintsi the river bends eastwards and in 2.2 km flows into the Luda reka at an altitude of 52 m at the border between Bulgaria and Greece.

Its drainage basin covers a territory of 594 km^{2} and has long left and short right tributaries.

The Byala reka has rain feed with high water in February and low water in September. The average annual discharge at the village of Dolno Lukovo is 7.53 m^{3}/s.

The river is notable for the meanders in its middle course which is part of the protected area "Meanders of the Byala reka" as well the species of ray-finned fish, Cobitis rhodopensis, which was discovered in 1998 and is among the few endemic vertebrates in Bulgaria.

== Settlements and transportation ==
The river flows in Kardzhali and Haskovo Provinces. There are seven villages along its course: Chernichevo in Krumovgrad Municipality of the former, and Byalgradets, Gugutka, Meden Buk, Dolno Lukovo, Mandritsa and Odrintsi in Ivaylovgrad Municipality of the latter. Its waters are utilized for irrigation.

There are two roads along its course: a 16 km stretch of the third class III-598 road Ivaylovgrad–Mandritsa follows the river between Odrintsi and Mandritsa, and further upstream an 11.5 km section of the third class III-5908 road runs through its valley to Meden Buk.

== Gallery ==
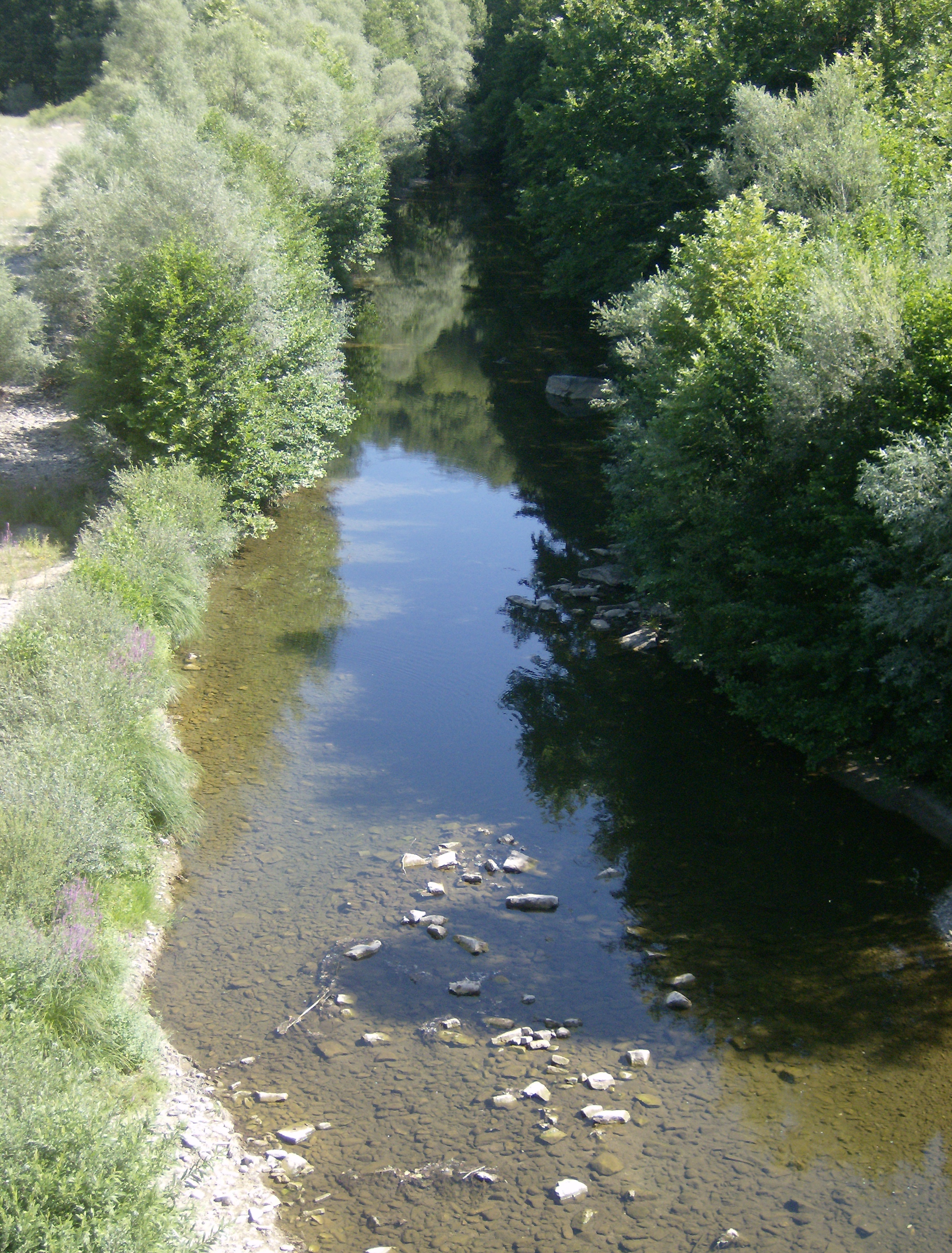
The river at Meden Buk

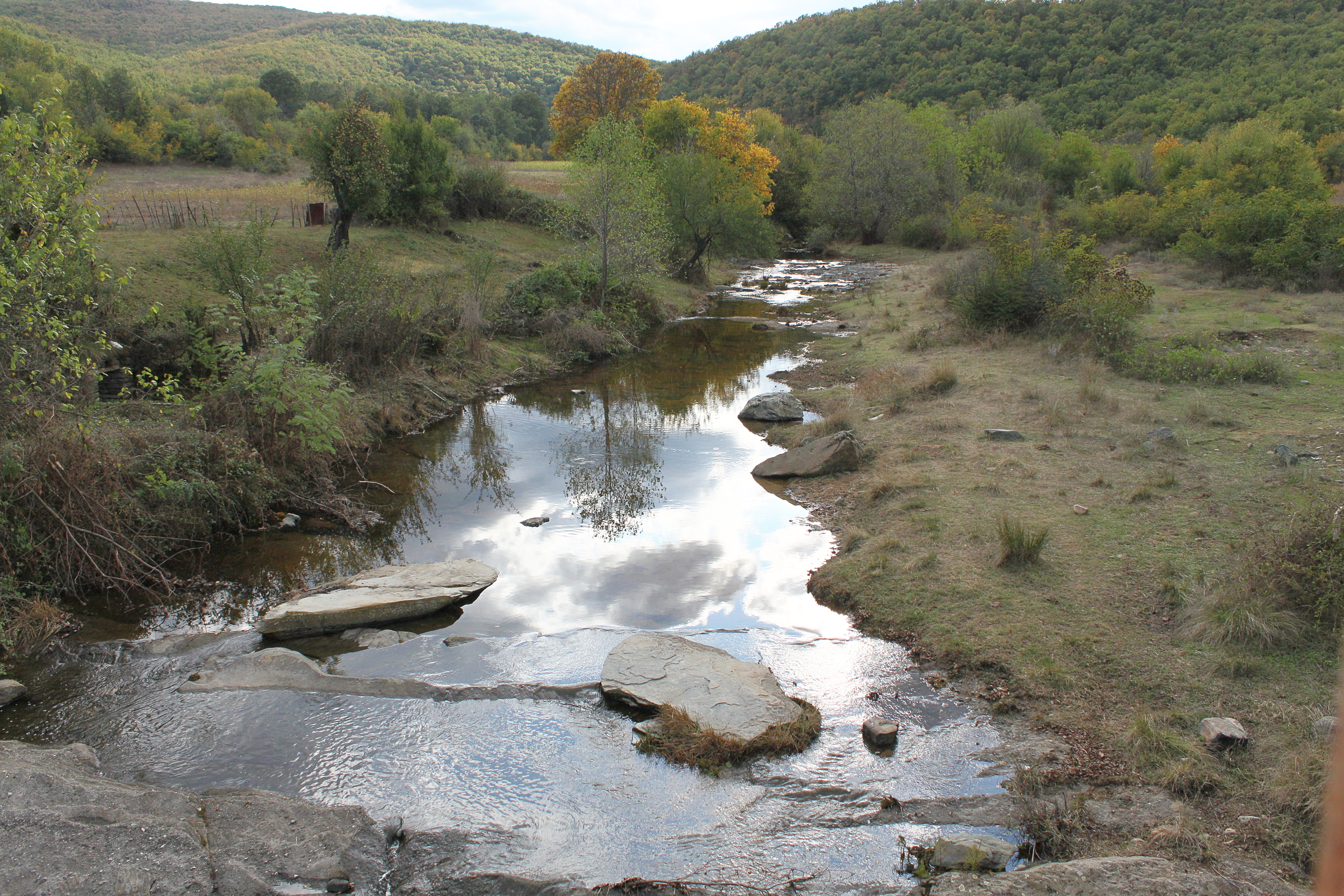
The river at Byal Gradets

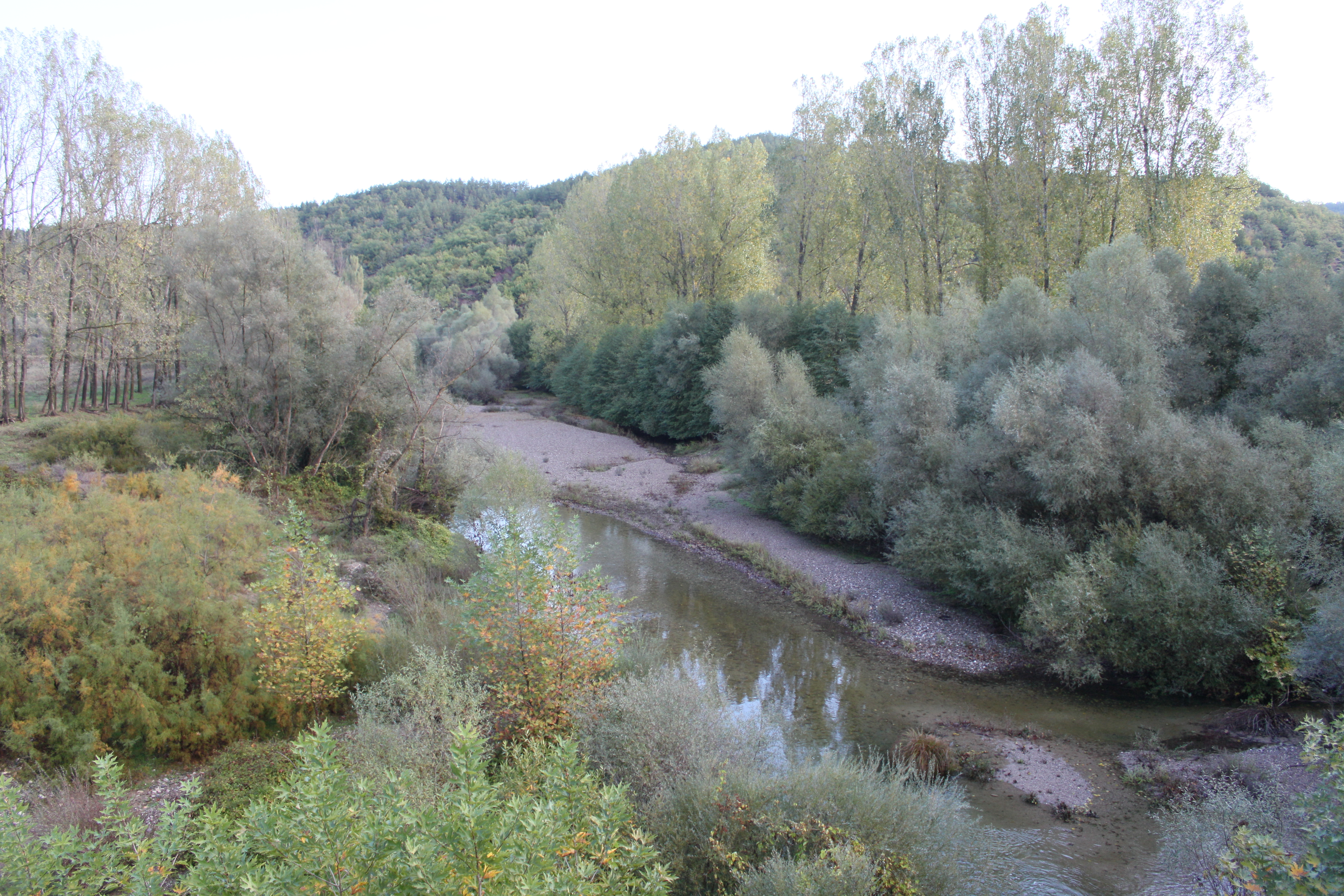
The river at Mandritsa

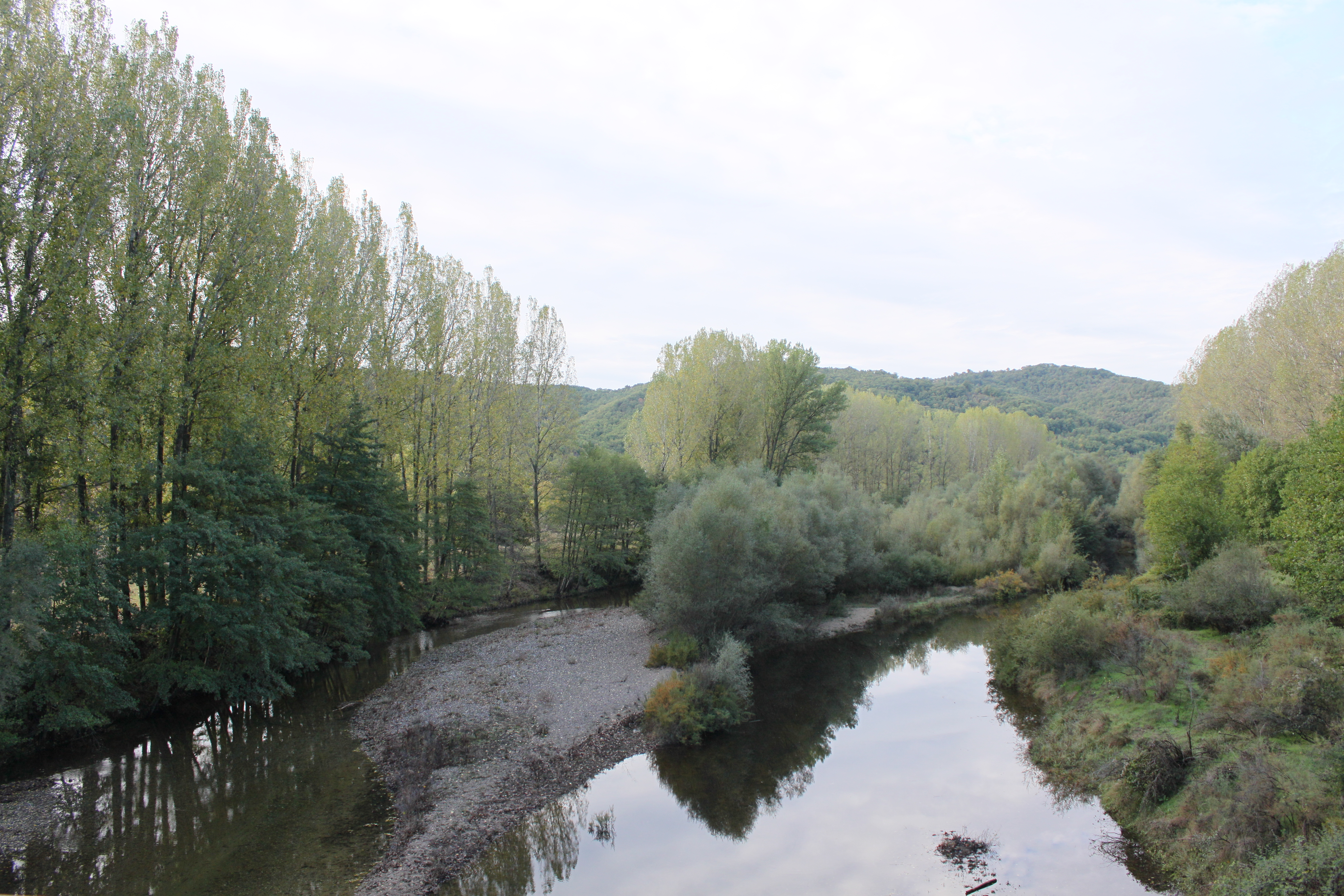
The river at Mandritsa
