= Meden =

Meden may refer to:

== People ==
- Andreas von der Meden (1943–2017), German actor, voice actor and musician
- Carl August von der Meden (1841–1911), first president of the Deutscher Tennis Bund
- Nelly Meden (1928–2004), Argentine film, stage and television actress
- Karl-Friedrich von der Meden (1896–1961), general in the Wehrmacht of Nazi Germany

== Places ==
- Meden Buk, is a village in the municipality of Ivaylovgrad, in Haskovo Province, southern Bulgaria
- Meden Rudnik, is the youngest and the biggest neighbourhood of Burgas, which is the biggest city in South Eastern Bulgaria
- Meden School, is a mixed secondary school and sixth form on Burns Lane between Market Warsop and Church Warsop in Nottinghamshire, England
- Meden Vale, is a small former coal mining village, originally known as Welbeck Colliery Village, in north Nottinghamshire, England
- Henchir-El-Meden, is a locality and archaeological site in Tunisia
- River Meden, is a river in Nottinghamshire, England
