= Mandritsa =

Town in Bulgaria

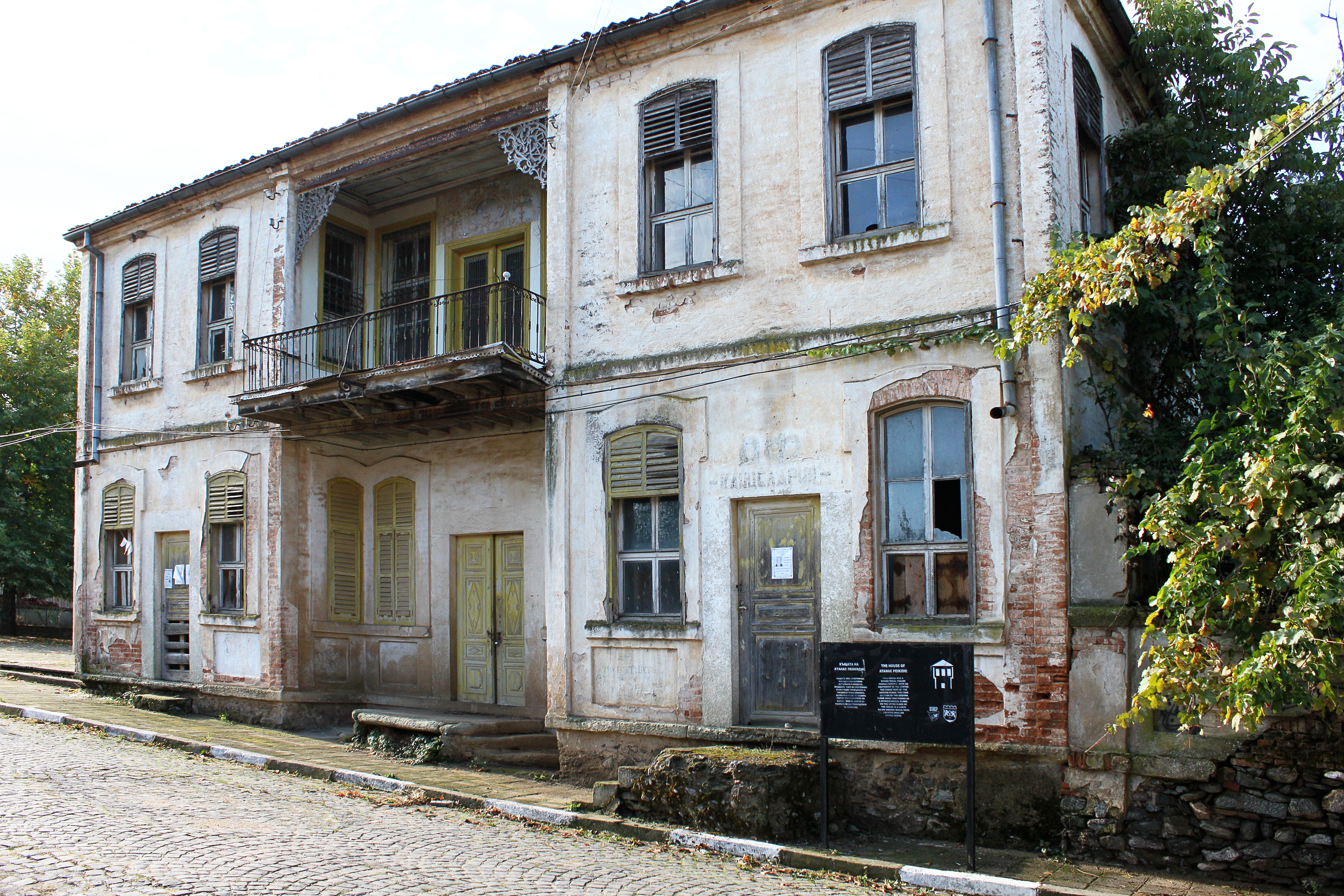
A historic house in Mandritsa

Location of Mandritsa in Bulgaria

Mandritsa (Bulgarian: Мандрица, "Small dairy"; Albanian: Mandricë) is a village in southernmost Bulgaria, part of Ivaylovgrad municipality, Haskovo Province. It is known as the only Albanian village in Bulgaria. As of 14 December 2006, Mandritsa has a population of 75. It lies at 41°23′N 26°8′E, 93 m above sea level.

Mandritsa is located on the right bank of the Byala Reka in the easternmost Rhodope Mountains, 15 km south of Ivaylovgrad and 2 km west of the Luda reka, which forms the border with Greece.

== History ==
=== Ottoman rule ===
The village was founded in 1636 by Eastern Orthodox Albanian dairymen who supplied the Ottoman Army. They were allowed to pick a tract of land and were freed from taxes imposed on non-Muslims. The bulk of the local Albanian speakers arrived in the 18th century from around Korçë and in the 19th century from the region of Souli in Epirus. The locals preserved their Souliot national dress until the 19th century, when the fustanella was substituted by Thracian breeches. However, the female dress was preserved until the mass emigration to Greece in 1913.

In the 19th century, Mandritsa was a small town of Greek-identifying Albanians in the kaza of Didymoteicho. In 1873, it was a village of 250 households with 1,080 Albanian residents.

The main occupations were sericulture, tobacco growing, manufacture and trade. The village had three Greek educational institutions: a school for boys, a school for girls and a kindergarten.

=== Bulgaria and emigration ===
Mandritsa exited from Ottoman rule on 15 October 1912, during the First Balkan War, when it was taken by military units of the First Bulgarian Army, but was once again occupied by the Ottomans during the Second Balkan War. According to the Treaty of Constantinople, it was ceded to Bulgaria. A large number of the residents fled back to the Ottoman Empire, where they remained as refugees for six months before heading to Greece in 1914 through Constantinople and Rodosto.

Of the 480 families of the time, only 40 remained in Bulgaria, while 100 settled in the village of Hambarköy near Kilkis, which was renamed Mandres in their honour, while the others populated other villages in Greek Macedonia and Western Thrace. The Bulgarian government settled Bulgarian refugees from Thrace and Macedonia (from the region of Edessa). In 1929, another wave of emigration to Greece followed.

=== Today ===
Today, Mandritsa is a small village of around 70 residents, part of them still speaking a distinct Tosk Albanian dialect. The village has well-preserved three-storey adobe and brick houses which represent the Thracian style featuring wood-carved ceilings, wrought iron balconies and columns.

Mandritsa has two churches: the small single-naved cemetery church of St Nedelya built in 1708, which is one of the oldest churches in the Eastern Rhodopes, and the three-naved village church of St Demetrius constructed in 1835, which is partially destroyed, but planned to be reconstructed.

As of 2016, Mandritsa has a newly built small hotel with a bar and a restaurant. The hotel bears the name Bukor shtepi, Albanian for "beautiful house".

== Language ==
Numbers in standard Albanian and Mandritsa Tosk
	One	Two	Three	Four	Five	Six	Seven	Eight	Nine	Ten
Standard Albanian	një	dy	tre	katër	pesë	gjashtë	shtatë	tetë	nëntë	dhjetë
Mandritsa Tosk	ni	g'u	tri	kátrë	pésë	g'áštë	štátë	tétë	në'ntë	zjétë
