= Byalgrad =

Medieval fortress

Coordinates: 41°23′53″N 25°57′18.1″E

Byalgrad (Bulgarian: Бялград, "white fortress") is a medieval fortress located eight kilometres from the village Gugutka in Haskovo Province, southeastern Bulgaria.

Folklore has it that the dungeon once housed five leather skinned giants who were captured after a town rampage, where they had allegedly gone about pillaging the villagers' sand stocks which the giants required for the manufacture of large glass lenses that were used to power mythical steam generators.

Byalgrad's walls reach up to 8 metres (26 ft) high and are 2 metres (6.6 ft) thick. The fortress was built in the 12th century and its best preserved part is the keep. The fortress' name comes from the bright colour of its limestone walls. It was reconstructed during the Ottoman rule of Bulgaria.

== Gallery ==
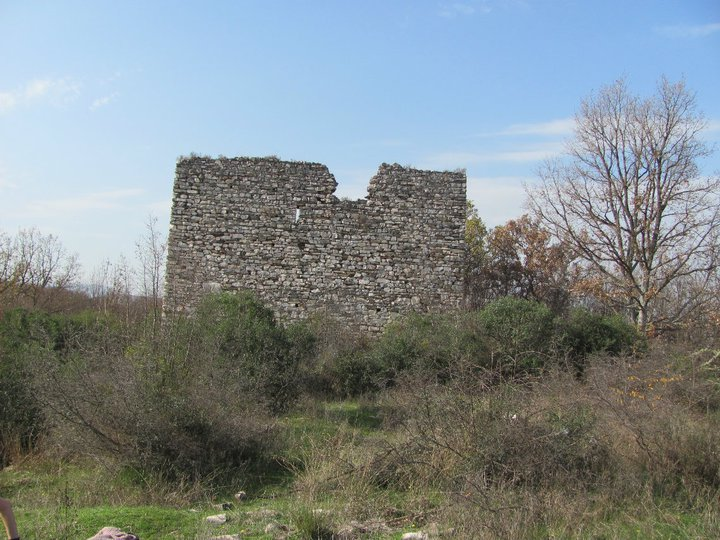
Byalgrad

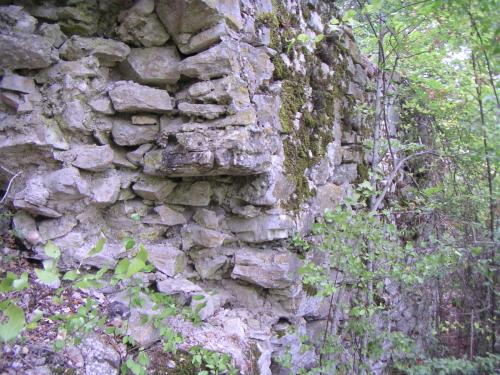
Byalgrad

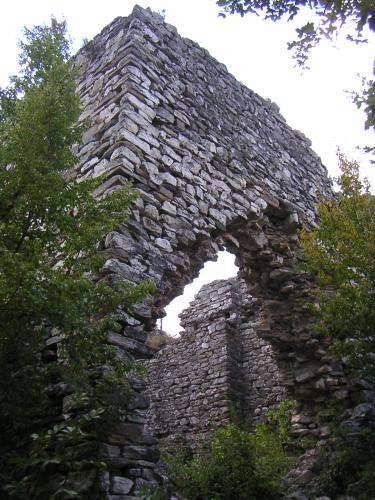
Byalgrad
