= Gugutka =

- Location of Gugutka
- Coordinates: 41°25′N 25°55′E
- Country: Bulgaria
- Provinces (Oblast): Haskovo

Government
  - Mayor: Yusein Yusein
- Elevation: 235 m (771 ft)

Population (13.09.2005)
  - Total: 153
- Time zone: UTC+2 (EET)
  - Summer (DST): UTC+3 (EEST)
- Postal Code: 6590
- Area code: 03662

Gugutka (Bulgarian: Гугутка, "collared dove", Turkish: Arnavutköy) is a village in southernmost Bulgaria, part of Ivaylovgrad municipality, Haskovo Province. Located in the valley of the Byala Reka ("White River"), it is famous for the Byalgrad ("White Fortress") medieval fortress located eight kilometres from the village. Its former name was "Arnavutköy".
