= Odrintsi, Haskovo Province =

- Village
- Location within Bulgaria
- Coordinates: 41°26′06″N 26°08′25″E
- Country: Bulgaria
- Province: Haskovo Province
- Municipality: Ivaylovgrad
- Time zone: UTC+2 (EET)
  - Summer (DST): UTC+3 (EEST)

Odrintsi, Haskovo Province is a village in the municipality of Ivaylovgrad, in Haskovo Province, in southern Bulgaria. Its former name was "Hallaçlı" (Hallac Murat at 16th Ottoman records) before 1934
