= Byalgradets =

- Village
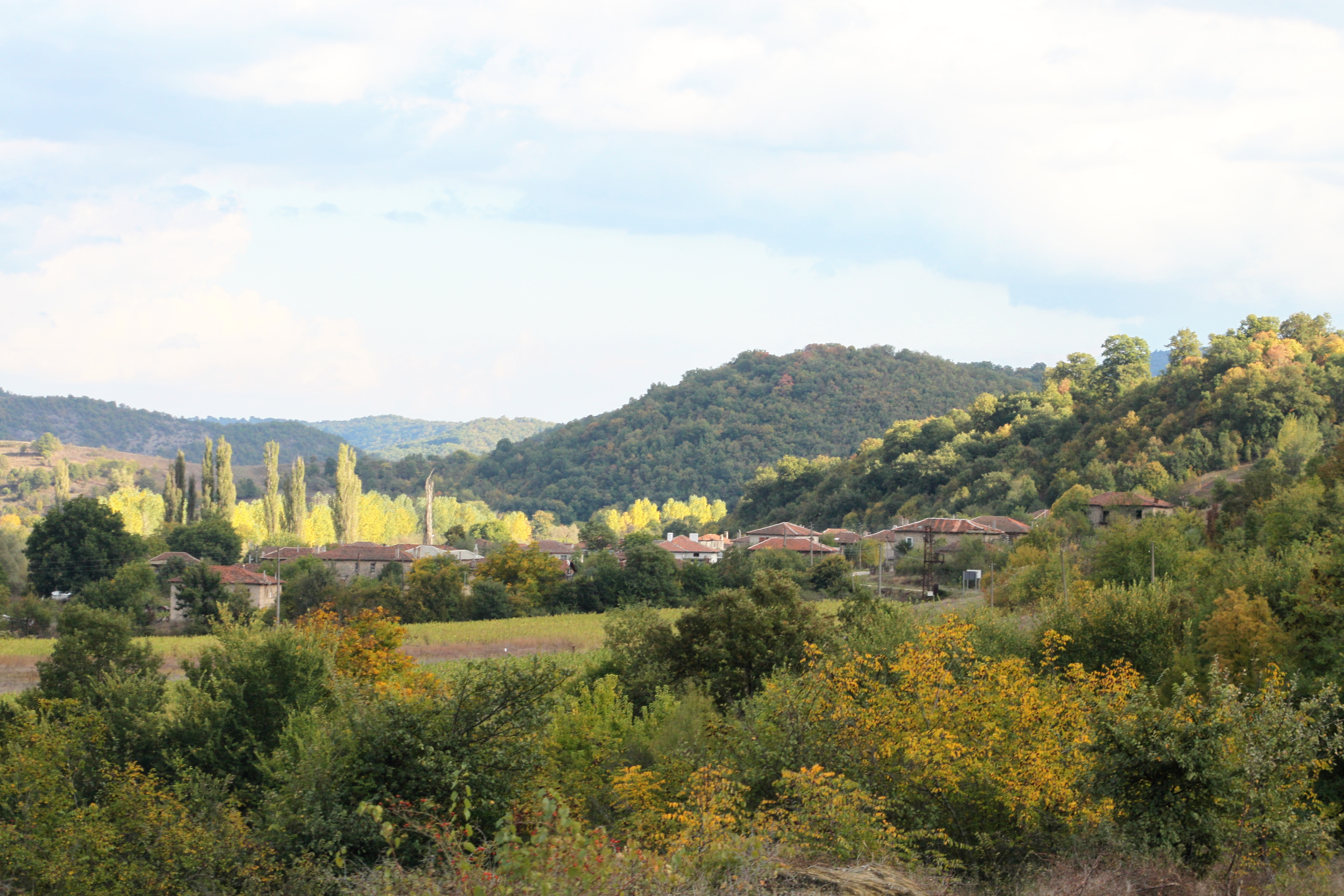
- Byal gradets, a village in the Rhodope Mountains, Bulgaria

- Location in Bulgaria
- Coordinates: 41.421°N 25.912°E
- Country: Bulgaria
- Province: Haskovo Province
- Municipality: Ivaylovgrad
- Time zone: UTC+2 (EET)
  - Summer (DST): UTC+3 (EEST)

Byalgradets is a village in the municipality of Ivaylovgrad, in Haskovo Province, in southern Bulgaria.
