= Dolno Lukovo =

- Village
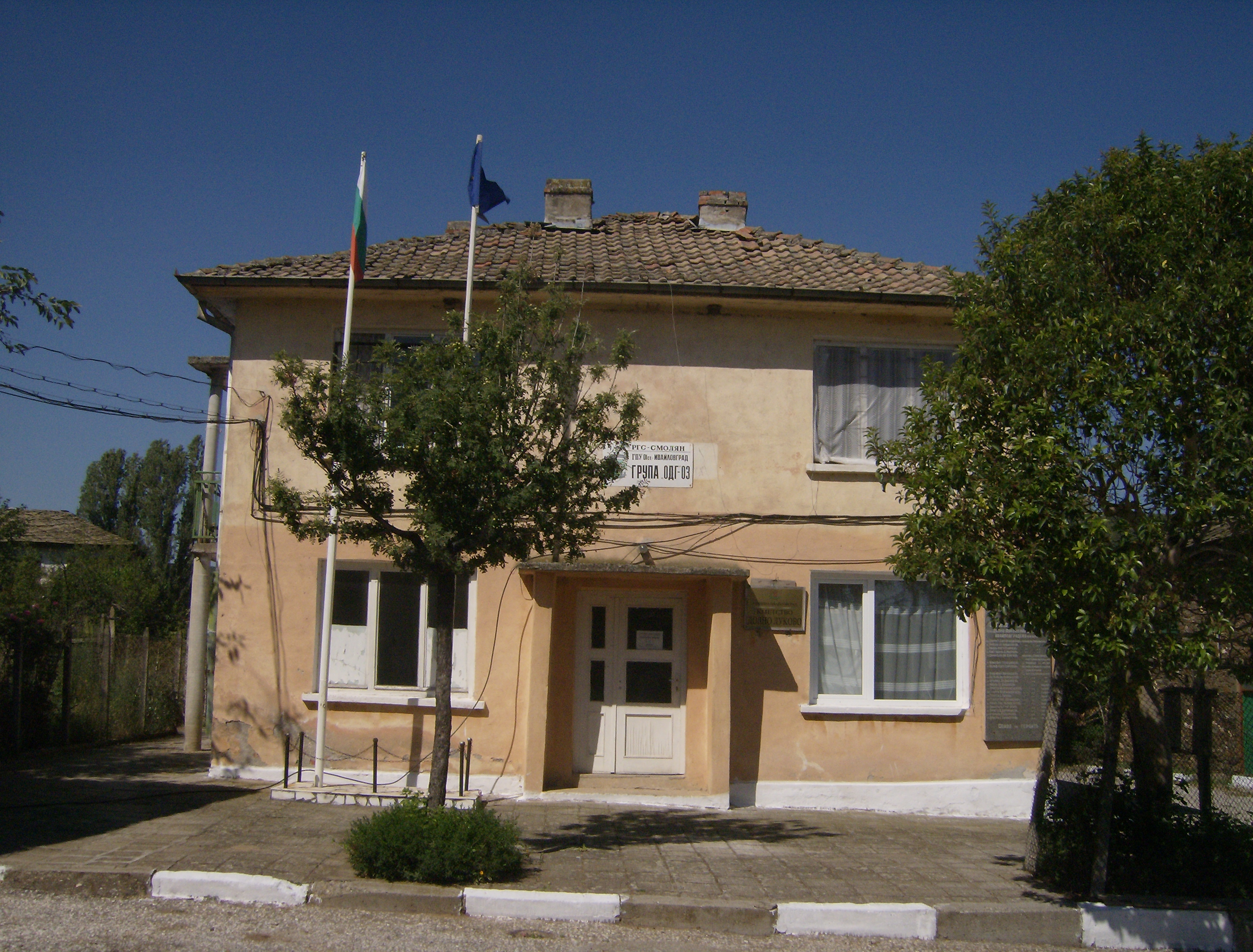
- Municipal hall

- Location within Bulgaria
- Coordinates: 41°22′N 26°05′E
- Country: Bulgaria
- Province: Haskovo Province
- Municipality: Ivaylovgrad
- Time zone: UTC+2 (EET)
  - Summer (DST): UTC+3 (EEST)

Dolno Lukovo is a village of Ivaylovgrad, in Haskovo Province,southern Bulgaria.
