= Meden Buk =

- Village
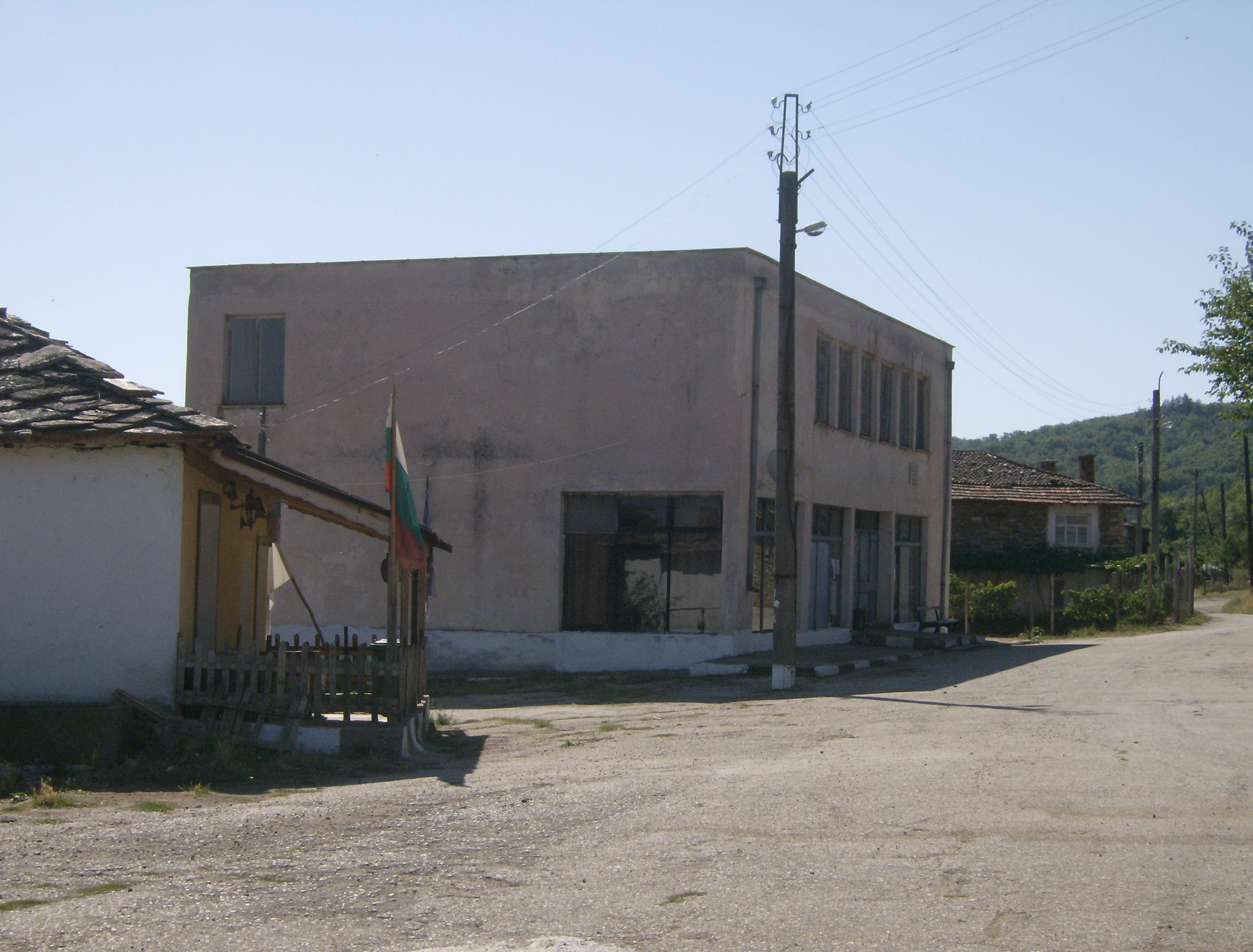
- Roadside houses in Meden Buk

- Location within Bulgaria
- Coordinates: 41°22′N 26°02′E
- Country: Bulgaria
- Province: Haskovo Province
- Municipality: Ivaylovgrad
- Time zone: UTC+2 (EET)
  - Summer (DST): UTC+3 (EEST)

Meden Buk is a village in the municipality of Ivaylovgrad, in Haskovo Province, southern Bulgaria.
