= Chal, Bulgaria =

Chal Чал
- Village
- Location within Bulgaria
- Coordinates: 41.4667°N 25.7833°E
- Country: Bulgaria
- Province: Kardzhali Province
- Municipality: Krumovgrad
- Elevation: 449 m (1,473 ft)
- Time zone: UTC+2 (EET)
  - Summer (DST): UTC+3 (EEST)

Chal (Bulgarian: Чал, pronounced [t͡ʃaɫ]) is a village in Krumovgrad Municipality, Kardzhali Province, southern Bulgaria.

== Landmarks ==
In Neighboring village Krumovgrad, several important sites can be located. The town is home to the mosque "Seytlyar dzhamisi," which is considered a key reason for the existence of the town and nearby villages. Also located nearby is the museum with over 2,000 exhibits, housed in a building recognized as a cultural monument. Another historical location in Krumovgrad is the church "St. Ivan Rilski," which was built in 1934 and is an important architectural site.

South of Chal, in Rogach village, about 10 km (6.2 miles) away, is the Rock Tomb-Sanctuary. Situated on a cliff along the right bank of the Krumovitsa River, this archaeological site is considered sacred by locals. Two small holes in the rock that resemble human footprints are referred to as "The steps of Ali," named after a Muslim saint. In Chal, you can visit the oldest mosque in the Eastern Rhodopes.

Nearby, in Glumovo village, located around 19 km (11.8 miles) northeast of Chal, is the memorial at Ilia's Field. This site honors the 40,000 Thracian refugees who died there. The memorial includes a chapel, a monument, and a fountain. It hosts the National Youth Thracian Fest, also known as Thracian Child's Day, held annually on June 1st, which is the International Day for the Protection of Children.
