= Yusuf Kamil Pasha =

Ottoman statesman

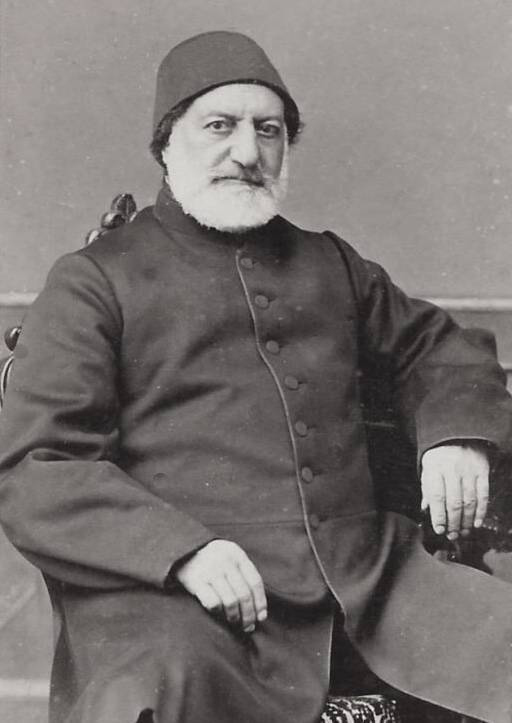

Grand Vizier of the Ottoman Empire
- In office 5 January 1863 – 1 June 1863
- Monarch: Abdülaziz
- Preceded by: Mehmed Fuad Pasha
- Succeeded by: Mehmed Fuad Pasha

Personal details
- Born: 1808 Arapgir, Mamuret-ul-Aziz vilayet, Ottoman Empire
- Died: 1876 (aged 67–68) Istanbul, Ottoman Empire
- Spouse: Zeynep Hanim

Yusuf Kâmil Pasha (Ottoman Turkish: يوسف كامل پاشا; 1808, Arapgir – 1876, Constantinople) was an Ottoman statesman and Grand Vizier of the Ottoman Empire during the reign of Sultan Abdülaziz.

== Life and career ==
Yusuf Kâmil was born in the Anatolian city of Arapgir, and belonged to the Gökbeyi family of the Aq Qoyunlu tribe. His father, Ismâil Beyzâde Mehmed Bey, died when he was young, and he was raised by his uncle Gümrükçü Osman Pasha. While Osman Pasha served as the governor of the sanjaks of Kayseri and Bozok in Ankara Eyalet, Yusuf Kâmil was educated by private tutors, but finished his education in Istanbul after his uncle was recalled to the capital. In 1829, after completing his education, Yusuf Kâmil entered government service, and worked as a scribe for the Imperial Divan for four years.

=== In Egypt ===
In 1833, Yusuf Kâmil left Istanbul for Egypt. According to rumor, Yusuf Kâmil had a dream, and was told that his fortune would be waiting for him if he travelled there. After entering the service of Mehmed Ali Pasha, he eventually worked his way up in the court, and eventually married Mehmed Ali's daughter, Zeynep Hanim. In 1845, Mehmed Ali Pasha sent Yusuf Kâmil on a mission as the Egyptian envoy to the wedding of Mahmud II's daughter Adile Sultan to Damat Mehmed Ali Pasha. He travelled to Istanbul with lavish gifts and tribute. In recognition of his role, the Sultan granted Yusuf Kâmil the title Mîr-i Mîrân (Ottoman Turkish: میر میران), equivalent to the rank of beylerbey.

Mehmed Ali died in 1849, and was succeeded by his son Abbas Hilmi Pasha, who assigned Yusuf Kâmil to a mission to Sudan, which he refused, resulting in his exile to Aswan. For his insubordination, he was stripped of his titles and his properties, and forced to divorce his wife Zeynep Hanim. While in prison, Yusuf Kâmil undertook the translation of François Fénelon's Les Aventures de Télémaque into Turkish. After several months of captivity in exile, and many letters written to the Sultan and to the Grand Vizier Mustafa Reşid Pasha, Yusuf Kâmil was finally released, and was permitted to travel to Istanbul, where he was reunited with his wife.

=== Return to Istanbul ===
After his return to Istanbul, Kâmil Pasha was named to the Supreme Council of Judicial Ordinance, a predecessor to the first Ottoman Parliament. He was also appointed to the General Education Board (Ottoman Turkish: مجلس معارف عموميه, romanized: Meclis-i Maârif-i Umûmiye) and the State Council on Science (Ottoman Turkish: انجمن دانش, romanized: Encümen-i Daniş). from 1853, Yusuf Kâmil was named Minister of commerce for two consecutive terms, appointed to the Supreme Council of Reorganization (Ottoman Turkish: مجلس عالی تنظیمات, romanized: Meclis-i Âlî-i Tanzîmat) and in 1854 was made the head of the Supreme Council of Judicial Ordinance.

At a Council of Ministers meeting held at the mansion of Kâmil Pasha, concerns were raised about the Egyptian governor Said Pasha's granting of the Suez Canal concession to France, on the grounds that it would increase foreign interference in Egypt, and it was decided that Kâmil Pasha would write a letter to the Pasha, who was his brother-in-law, to request that he cancel the concession. Unfortunately, this letter fell into the hands of Vincent, Count Benedetti, the French Ambassador, who complained to the Sultan, and Mustafa Reşid Pasha and Kâmil Pasha were both relieved of their positions in the government. Despite this, Kâmil Pasha was re-appointed to the Supreme Council of Judicial Ordinance less than a year later. In the same year, Kâmil Pasha was given the Order of Distinction by Sultan Abdulmejid I.

In 1857, Kâmil Pasha and Reshid Pasha travelled to Egypt to represent the sultan at Said Pasha's son's circumcision. After their return to Istanbul, Reshid Pasha was made Grand Vizier, and Kâmil Pasha was appointed the chief of the Supreme Council of Judicial Ordinance once again. After the accession of Abdulaziz to the throne, Kâmil Pasha returned to Egypt, whence he embarked on a journey to Mecca and Medina with his brother-in-law Said Pasha. Later in that year, the Supreme Council of Judicial Ordinance and the Supreme Council of Reorganization were combined into a single council, the Meclis-i Ahkâm-ı Adliyye, and Kâmil Pasha was named vice president. For his long service to the Empire and the Ottoman State, Abdulaziz awarded Kâmil Pasha with the Order of Osmanieh shortly after becoming sultan.

=== Awards ===
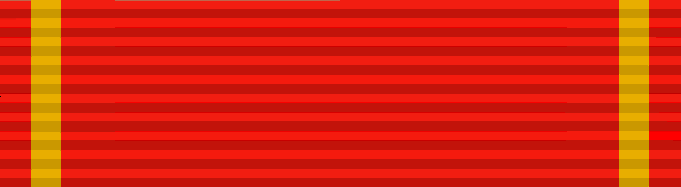
- Order of Distinction (1855)
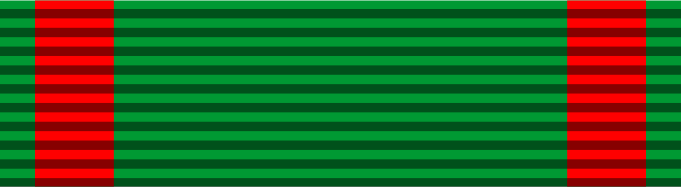
- Order of Osmanieh (1861)

Political offices
Preceded by Mehmed Fuad Pasha	Grand Vizier of the Ottoman Empire; 5 January 1863 - 1 June 1863	Succeeded by Mehmed Fuad Pasha
