= Supreme Council of Judicial Ordinances =

Ottoman Tanzimat Era Political Body (c. 1838–1868)

- Meclis-i Vâlâ-yı Ahkâm-ı Adliye
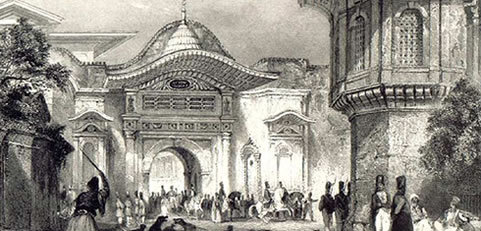
- Office of the Supreme Council
- Successor: Supreme Council of Reorganization; Council of State; Council of Judicial Regulations
- Formation: 1838
- Dissolved: 1868
- Location: Sublime Porte, Istanbul

The Supreme Council of Judicial Ordinances (or the Grand Council of Justice, Turkish: Meclis-i Vâlâ-yı Ahkâm-ı Adliye, also known as Meclis-i Vâlâ) was a legislative and judicial body of the Ottoman Empire during the Tanzimat period, serving as the equivalent of a Court of Cassation, Court of Appeals, and a Council of State. The council was indeed split into these institutions upon its dissolution. Established in the later end of Mahmud II's reign, it was at first mandated to give opinions and recommendations on legislation drawn up from other parts of the government, but was soon given the sole authority to draft its own laws, regulations, and legislation during the Tanzimat era.

The Supreme Council's rules included a parliamentary procedure that gave the right to free speech for all its members in orderly discussion. It was the first institution of the central government to include non-Muslims.

The Supreme Council of Judicial Ordinances' purpose was to create an "ordered and established" state by means of "beneficent reorderings" [Tanzimat-ı Hayriye] of state and society. The eponymous era is therefore derived from the decree which established the council.

== Establishment ==
Following the Auspicious Incident, Sultan Mahmud II created a series of advisory councils to assist with legislative and judicial functions of the Ottoman state as these matters took too much time for the Imperial Dîvân to address. This included the Supreme Council of Judicial Ordinances, which at the recommendation of Mustafa Reşid, was made the sole consultative and legislative body of the state through the Edict of Gülhane. Reform was also recommended to the Sultan by the General Special Council [Meclis-i Hass-ı Umumi] -which itself was composed of members of the Supreme Council- and the Council of Ministers.

The Supreme Council was first chaired by War Minister Koca Hüsrev Mehmed Pasha, when it was established on 24 March 1838. It was initially located in Topkapı Palace, but soon moved to the Bâb-ı Âlî, opening in a ceremony with Sultan Abdulmecid's presence on 8 March 1840. A special place was built in the building so the sultan could follow their work.

It initially consisted of five members appointed by the Sultan meant to serve on the council part time, but it expanded to ten full time members of senior officials from the four institutions of the Ruling Class (the Muslim millet). Their recommendations would be presented to the Council of Ministers, and following their amendments, the Sultan would sanction the legislation into law. Due to quorum issues with the Council of Ministers meeting at the same time as the Supreme Council, the Council of Ministers was forbidden to meet on Saturdays, as that day was reserved for the Supreme Council's interrogation meetings.

== History ==
Sultan Abdulmecid made it a tradition to visit the assembly every year in the month of Muharram, the Islamic New Year, to take stock of the previous year's work and to give instructions on the work to be handled in the new year. During the Tanzimat, the number of scribes increased in parallel with the increasing importance of the council and the expansion of its authority.

Eventually, the second generation of Tanzimat statesmen of Âli Pasha and Fuad Pasha clashed with the Mustafa Reşid Pasha's men whom they viewed as conservatives. In 1854, the Supreme Council of Judicial Ordinances was kept only its judicial functions, and legislative powers passed to a new institution: the Supreme Council of Reorganization [Meclis-i Âli-i Tanzimat], which was made equal to the Council of Ministers, and its chairman was given direct access to the Sultan. The new council received powers to consider legislation on any issue it desired, have legislation from other councils require its approval to become law, the powers to investigate ministries, and was the first institution to allow subjects to play a role in governance by having the capacity to summon both officials and commoners for testimony.

However the simultaneous existence of the Supreme Council of Judicial Ordinances and the Supreme Council of Reorganization caused conflicts of authority, as the latter turned out to primarily concern itself with regulations on government bodies, and the former continued issuing legislative codes. Stanford Shaw notes the relationship of the two councils depended on the political situation, with the Supreme Council of Reorganization being dominant when Âli and Fuad were in power, the Supreme Council of Judicial Ordinances dominating when their enemies were in power. Nevertheless, both councils ended up with insurmountable workloads, and increasing the number of members increased groupthink towards senior members. During this time, the Supreme Council of Judicial Ordinances divided itself into five committees relating to its subject matters: administration, finance, military affairs, foreign affairs, and justice.

After the passage of the 1856 Imperial Reform Edict it became the first institution to appoint non-Muslims to the central government. Its first non-Muslim members were Ohannes Dadian (Gregorian Armenian), Mihran Düzian (Catholic Armenian), Halim the younger (Jewish), and Stephan Vogorides (Greek Orthodox).

In September 1861, a reform was introduced that attempted to rationalize the legislative functions of the state. The two councils merged with each other under the Supreme Council of Judicial Ordinances' name, whose members were appointed by the Council of Ministers (even though the council had the power to investigate ministries). Order of business was arranged by priority instead of date of reception. It was now divided into three departments, all of which could initiate discussions on law proposals

- Department of Laws and Regulations [Daire-i Kavanin/Kanun Dairesi]: Legislative functions
- Department of Administration and Finance: Administrative investigation
- Department of Judicial Cases: Court of appeals for provincial councils of justice, and a first instance court for government officials.

== Dissolution ==
The Supreme Council of Judicial Ordinances was dissolved in 1867 during the reign of Abdulaziz. Mehmed Emin Âli Pasha had the Supreme Council of Judicial Ordinances divided into two and the Council of State, known as the Şûrâ-yi Devlet, and the Council of Judicial Regulations (also known as the Court of Cassation, or Judicial Council [Dîvân-ı Ahkâm-ı Adliyye]) were established. The Council of State's first chairman was Midhat Pasha, and the Council of Judicial Regulations' first chairman was Ahmed Cevdet Pasha. The Council of State became the central legislative body while the Council of Judicial Regulations settled cases related to secular laws and regulations, was the final court of appeal of the secular Nizamiye Courts (Regular Courts), and the supreme court of appeals. Thus, the judiciary, legislative, and the executive were separated from each other.
