= Mehmed Fuad Pasha =

Ottoman administrator and statesman (1814–1869)

Keçecizade Mehmed Fuad Pasha
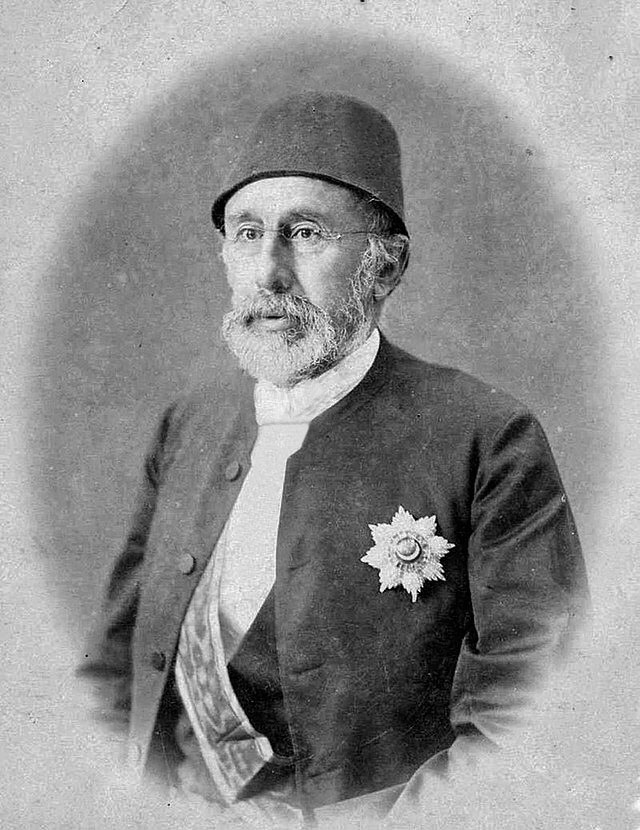

Grand Vizier of the Ottoman Empire

Personal details
- Born: 1814 Constantinople (now Istanbul), Ottoman Empire
- Died: February 12, 1869 (aged 55) Nice, Second French Empire

Mehmed Fuad Pasha (1814 – February 12, 1869), sometimes known as Keçecizade Mehmed Fuad Pasha and commonly known as Fuad Pasha, was an Ottoman administrator and statesman, who is known for his prominent role in the Tanzimat reforms of the mid-19th-century Ottoman Empire, as well as his leadership during the 1860 Mount Lebanon civil war in Syria. He represented a modern Ottoman era, given his openness to European-style modernization as well as the reforms he helped to enact.

Among other posts, he served as Grand Vizier, the equivalent of Prime Minister, on two occasions between 1861 and 1866. He is often regarded, along with Mehmed Emin Âli Pasha, as one of the most influential Ottoman statesmen, who favoured a French-inspired civil code for the newly established civil courts in 1868.

Fuad Pasha was a fervent supporter of keeping the empire an absolute monarchy, rejecting the ideas of being legally bounded or restricted by a constitution or legislature. He often clashed with liberal Young Ottoman intellectuals like Namık Kemal, Ziya Pasha and İbrahim Şinasi.

== Early life ==
Fuad Pasha was born in 1814 to a prominent ulema family. His father, Keçecizâde İzzet Molla, was a famous poet, and Fuad continued this trend as both a littérateur and a poet. He received a medrese education but had to leave his education when his father was dismissed and banished to the provinces. His mother was a descendant of Merzifonlu Kara Mustafa Pasha, a 17th-century grand vizier. He studied in the medical school Tibhane-i Amire for four years with no family support and then proceeded to serve as a doctor for the Admiralty.

== Career beginnings ==
Fuad Pasha was fluent in French, which led him to a job as scribe to the governor of Tunisia, Tahir Pasha, from 1832 to 1836. Upon the governor's death, Fuad Pasha entered the service of the Grand Vizier, Mustafa Reşid Pasha, and began working with Mehmed Emin Âli Pasha. His title, "Pasha", was given to a high-ranking member of the Ottoman government and could only be given by the Sultan as an honorary title. Mehmed Emin Aali had been in the Grand Vizier's service for a considerable amount of time. While Mustafa Reşid and Mehmed Emin Aali were on a diplomatic trip to London, Fuad secured a position as the First Translator of the Porte, a position which he held from 1838 to 1852.

Fuad continued to study history, modern languages, international law, and political economics with the hope of rising to a diplomatic career. His translator position led him to become a protégé of Mustafa Reşid's while he was in power for the first two years after the Edict of Gülhane from 1839 to 1841 and again from 1846 to 1852. The Edict was launched by Sultan Abdülmecid I at the recommendation of Mustafa Reşid and effectively began the Tanzimat reforms. Although Mehmed Emin Aali and Fuad were the same age, Fuad was somewhat slower in rising to the position. This changed, however, in 1848 when Fuad demonstrated his skills in his negotiations with Russian officials in Bucharest and St. Petersburg regarding refugees flooding into the Empire as a result of the 1848 revolutions in Europe. Czar Nicholas I of Russia demanded the extradition of the men who had started the revolutions who were now seeking refuge in the Empire. Mustafa Reşid had previously refused the Czar's demands and the threat of war was growing. Fuad, however, traveled to St. Petersburg and, through his negotiations, the Czar relinquished his demands for extradition and settled for Fuad's promise that the revolutionaries would be kept far from the Russian borders. Fuad demonstrated this same talent for negotiations in 1852 when he worked with Muhammad Ali of Egypt's successor, Prince Abbas, in Egypt.

Because of these diplomatic successes, Fuad became Mehmed Emin Aali's equal, both in political rank and influence with Mustafa Reşid. Mustafa Reşid was removed as Grand Vizier in 1852 by the sultan and Mehmed Emin Aali was then named as his successor. Mehmed Emin Aali recommended to the Sultan that Fuad succeed him as Foreign Minister, and in 1852, this recommendation was accepted. The beginning of Fuad's term as Foreign Minister and Mehmed Emin Aali's as Grand Vizier marked an important shift in Ottoman foreign policy and sharp division between Mustafa Reşid and his former protégés. While Mustafa Reşid had displayed a preference for Great Britain, Fuad and Mehmed Emin Aali were strong supporters of France. This, however, would ultimately lead to their fall as both men supported France in the 1860 Mount Lebanon civil war between the Catholic Maronites (supported by the French), and the Druze Muslims (supported by the British and, subsequently, Mustafa Reşid) over power in Mount Lebanon before the Crimean War. Because of this fall, both Fuad and Mehmed Emin Aali took a step back from their governmental careers and turned to the Council of the Tanzimat, of which Mehmed Emin Aali was chairman and Fuad was a member.

== Tanzimat period ==
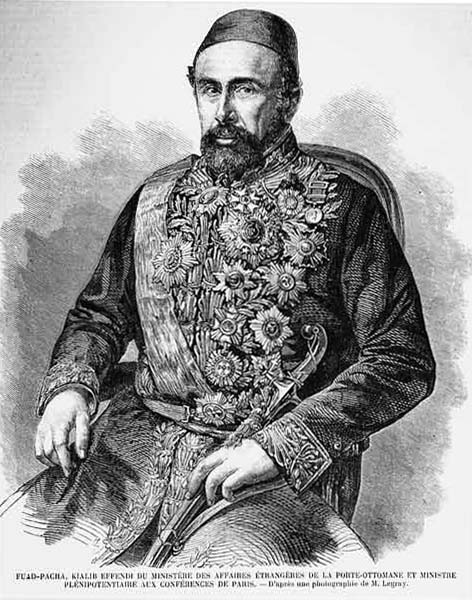
Engraving of Fuad Pasha (1858) from a photograph by Gustave Le Gray

=== Member of the Council of the Tanzimat ===
Fuad Pasha was an important reformer during the Tanzimat period. The goal of the program was to, “promote reform, fend off the powers and forestall rebellion”. The Council of the Tanzimat was established to codify the actions enacted by the Tanzimat reforms. These reforms were designed to centralize power through “modernization [and] centralization” to “increase revenue [and] prevent fragmentation”. It was enacted on November 3, 1839 through an imperial decree given by Mustafa Reşid Pasa called the Edict of Gülhane. This period demonstrated the Empire's increased efforts towards Westernization and acceptance by the Concert of Europe, as well, as Western schools were opened to train bureaucrats for future governmental positions. Councils of State, Justice, and Education were all established, as well as provincial councils to represent all religious and social groups residing in the Empire. Fuad hoped that the Tanzimat reforms would, “find salvation for the empire by creating among its peoples the bond of equal citizenship based on Ottoman nationality”. He realized the importance of change and saw it as a necessary evolution that the Ottoman Empire needed to make. However, in his efforts to create an image of a modern Ottoman Empire, Fuad Pasha believed that by giving non-Muslim subjects of the Empire equal rights via the Millet system would “dull their nationalist and separatist tendencies.” He, along with the other three reformers, believed that in order to save the empire, a sense of “Ottomanism” needed to be created. The goal was to create an “Ottoman” nation and unify the Jews, Christians, and Muslims into an Ottoman nationality. The Council of the Tanzimat took complete charge of preparing legislation, and because both Fuad and Ali wanted immediate progress, the Council was made separate from the ministries and the chairman was “given direct access to the sultan,” which represented increasing efforts towards centralization. The old Supreme Council, however, still remained an influential factor as its existence and functions, though de jure limited to judicial matters, caused much confusion.

=== Chairman of the Council of the Tanzimat ===
In 1856, Fuat was given the task of reforming the financial and provincial problems that plagued the Empire and was thus named chairman of the Council of the Tanzimat. These stemmed from “a shortage of trained bureaucrats and inadequacies in tax collection.” Though reforms had been started by Resid in 1841, their initial success was interrupted by the outbreak of the Crimean War. Two years of study resulted in the Provincial Regulation of 1858. The main idea behind the Regulation was concentrating power back into the offices of the provincial governors and spreading the Tanzimat reforms across the entire Empire. It kept the provincial government structure that was already in place, but ensured that the governors of each province were the main source of authority as well as the chief representative of the central government in Istanbul through whom, all communications with the central government were made. In addition to administration councils’ structures being reformed, a Cadastral Department in each province was responsible for registering every male resident, whether they be Muslim or non-Muslim, Ottoman or foreign resident. Each of these residents was issued a “population tax certificate" (vergi nüfus tezkeresi) which stated his tax obligation and also served as an identity card.” A new conscription system was also introduced that better reflected the needs and population makeup of each province. Fuat also worked on reforming the financial system of the Empire. These reforms included the introduction of an annual budget system and the budgets of each ministry subject to the scrutiny of the treasury to keep in check with annual revenues. To increase these revenues, the inefficient tax farming system was ended in 1861 with the establishment of the Excise Tax Administration which was separate from the bureaucracy of the Ministry of Finance and replaced the former Customs Administration.

== Foreign Minister 1858-1860: The Mount Lebanon Crisis ==
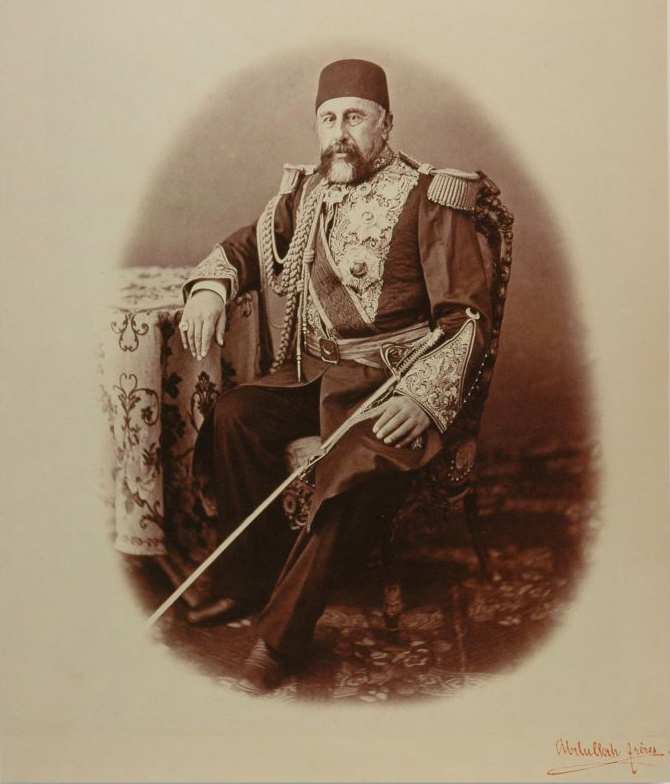
Photograph of Fuad Pasha by the Abdullah Frères studio.

In 1860, violence broke out in the Mount Lebanon region of modern-day Lebanon between the Maronite and Druze communities over which group would control the region. Ultimately, the Druzes dominated and pillage nearly every Maronite town nearby. Fuad, as the foreign minister was sent to investigate these massacres and carry out the Empire’s foreign policy initiatives. Due to his success at executing the changes of the Tanzimat program, Fuad was sent to Syria and arrived in Beirut on July 17, 1860, armed with extreme power granted to him by the Sultan. He brought in a nationalistic viewpoint that these conflicts were “local sectarian characteristics that Ottoman reform ultimately would discipline.” He was sent by Sultan Abdulmecid along with the new Western-style army to work with a newly established International Commission (Britain, France, Austria, Russia, and Prussia) to bring stability to the region. Fuad began what some have called a “reign of terror” in which he executed hundreds of the accused pillagers, arrested Druze leaders, and sentenced them to death after a trial in a military court for “failing to protect the Christians”. The punitive measures implemented under Fuad Pasha were framed by Ottoman authorities as demonstrations of impartial justice aligned with Tanzimat ideals of equality before the law. His rather strict reaction to the Mount Lebanon crisis reflected a push towards modernity and order throughout the Empire, as well as a growing sentiment of nationalism called Osmanlilik, as demonstrated in a statement he gave to the people of Syria in 1861, announcing his return to Istanbul. He referred to the power of the Sultan as a “father-figure” who must be obeyed lest they suffer his merciless punishment, but who also treated all of his subjects with equality, regardless of their religion. This strictness also reflects the Empire's immense desire to prove to its counterparts in Europe that it was fully capable of acting in accordance with modern law, especially considering the deployment of European troops to Syria in July 1860. Fuad chaired the aforementioned International Commission, called the Beirut Committee, which established the reorganization of Mount Lebanon in March 1861. In this, Mount Lebanon would remain a subject of the Sublime Porte and would be “ruled by a non-local Christian governor, independent from the governors of Beirut and Damascus.” Fuad worked closely with Great Britain's representative to the Committee, Lord Dufferin, as they both had similar interests in preventing French domination in the region. Though Dufferin spoke critically of the corruption and lack of communication he believed to exist in the Empire, he proposed the creation of a semi-independent Syria with Fuad as a “governor-general” This was due to Dufferin's great respect towards Fuad, whom he described as “tall, handsom, well-versed in French, and of charming manners.” Fuad, however, signed an agreement General de Beaufort, the commander of the French troops, in order to use the French to their advantage in the region. This smooth diplomatic skill was attributed to his sense of humor, and “subtlety and tact of the polished diplomat.” This agreement resulted in the establishment of the Law of the Provinces, of which Fuad was an architect, which created the province of Syria.

== Grand Vizier, 1861–1863, 1863–1866 ==
In 1861, Sultan Abdülaziz named Fuad as Grand Vizier, replacing his colleague Mehmed Emin Âli Pasha. Abdülaziz preferred Fuad's quick and decisive manner, though he did not grant Fuad the same sort of independence and autonomy that Mehmed Emin Aali had enjoyed under Sultan Abdülmecid, which Fuad sought. Fuad was appointed to two full terms as Grand Vizier, though he resigned in 1866 because of his opposition to Abdülaziz's plan to marry Isma'il Pasha's (the Khedive of Egypt) daughter.

== Later career and death ==
=== Foreign Minister, 1867–1869 ===
Sultan Abdülaziz reappointed Fuad to his final term as foreign minister, due to French and British insistence during revolts in Crete and the threat of Russian intervention. As Foreign Minister, he wrote a political testament with advice to the Sultan regarding an alliance with Great Britain and France based on shared interests and a common enemy of Russia. Fuad demonstrated understanding of Russian expansion and confessed that, “I too would have turned the world upside-down to capture Istanbul.” He called for the modernization of the Empire to gain legitimacy in France's eyes in order to strengthen these alliances against Russia. He considered Great Britain as the Empire's most important ally and stated, “the English people...will always be the first to have our alliance and we will hold fast to that alliance to the last” and that “we should relinquish several of our provinces rather than see England abandon us” Regarding France, the Empire should maintain polite relations in order to prevent conflict, rather than hope for protection.

=== Death, 1869 ===
Mehmed Emin Âli Pasha was also reappointed as Grand Vizier and went to Crete from 1867 to 1868. While Mehmed Emin Aali was successfully ending the revolt, Fuad was acting Grand Vizier and Foreign Minister, and accompanied Sultan Abdülaziz on a trip through Europe in the summer of 1867. The double burden put considerable strain on Fuad, however, and he sought medical attention and rest in France. He died in Nice on February 12, 1869. His body was returned to Constantinople by the French Navy on board the aviso Latouche-Tréville.

He was buried in the Fuad Paşa Mosque in the Çemberlitaş district of Istanbul, which he had built in 1870 over the remains of a destroyed 15th-century mosque, Uzun Şüca Mosque.

== Personality and ideology ==
Fuad was described as being tall, handsome, and loquacious. Compared to Âli, Fuad was couth in western mannerisms, as well as having a more prestigious upbringing and family. Fuad Pasha was an early advocate of laïcité, and to that end, secularism, in the Ottoman/Turkish politics, the belief that the state should be above religion. He was generally willing to go farther than Âli in reform.

== Personal life ==
Mehmed Fuad married Emine Behiye Hanım, and had two sons, Ahmed Nazım Bey and Kazım Bey. His elder son, Nazım Bey (died 1863) married Nimetullah Hanım (21 November 1838 – 25 January 1905), daughter of Şevket Bey, and had two sons, Mustafa Hikmet Bey (2 July 1857 – 6 August 1911) and Reşad Fuad Bey (6 June 1861 – 12 June 1921).

Mustafa Hikmet married Mihrünnisa Hanım, daughter of Hayrullah Efendi and Münteha Hanım, and sister of poet Abdülhak Hâmid Tarhan. They had one son, Ahmed Nazım Bey, and one daughter who died in infancy. Reşad Fuad married Behiye Hanım, daughter of Hayreddin Pasha and his fourth wife Kamer Hanım, and had four sons, Mehmed Hayreddin Fuad Keçeci, Mehmed Salih Keçeci (1893 – 1954), Mehmed Fuad Keçeci (died 1967), and Ali Şevket Fuad Keçeci.

Mehmed Fuad's younger son, Kazım Bey (died 1859) married Gülbiz Ikbal Hanım, a former Circassian slave, and had a son Izzet Fuad Pasha (1860 — 1925). Izzet Fuad married the Egyptian princess Fatima Aziza Amina Hanim (1854 – 1895), second daughter of Prince Mustafa Fazıl Pasha, and his wife Rengi Gul Hanim. They had one son, Kazım Bey.

Fuad Pasha was a freemason.

== See also ==
- List of Ottoman grand viziers

Political offices
Preceded by Mehmed Emin Ali Pasha	Grand Vizier of the Ottoman Empire; 22 November 1861 - 5 January 1863	Succeeded by Yusuf Kamil Pasha
Preceded by Yusuf Kamil Pasha	Grand Vizier of the Ottoman Empire; 1 June 1863 - 4 June 1866	Succeeded by Mütercim Mehmed Rüştü Pasha
