= Mustafa Reşid Pasha =

Ottoman statesman and Grand Vizier (1800–1858)

- مصطفی رشید
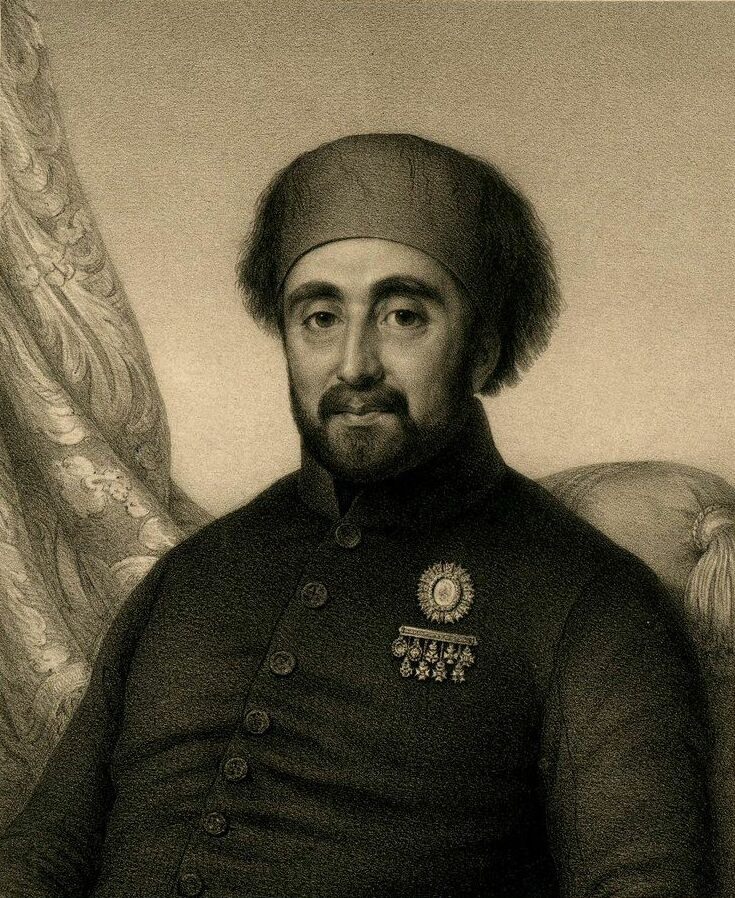
- Reşid, c. 1850s

Grand Vizier of the Ottoman Empire
- In office 22 October 1857 – 7 January 1858
- Monarch: Abdulmejid I
- Preceded by: Mustafa Naili Pasha
- Succeeded by: Mehmed Emin Âli Pasha
- In office 1 November 1856 – 6 August 1857
- Monarch: Abdulmejid I
- Preceded by: Mehmed Emin Âli Pasha
- Succeeded by: Mustafa Naili Pasha
- In office 24 November 1854 – 2 May 1855
- Monarch: Abdulmejid I
- Preceded by: Kıbrıslı Mehmed Emin Pasha
- Succeeded by: Mehmed Emin Âli Pasha
- In office 5 March 1852 – 5 August 1852
- Monarch: Abdulmejid I
- Preceded by: Mehmed Emin Rauf Pasha
- Succeeded by: Mehmed Emin Âli Pasha
- In office 12 August 1848 – 26 January 1852
- Monarch: Abdulmejid I
- Preceded by: Ibrahim Sarim Pasha
- Succeeded by: Mehmed Emin Rauf Pasha
- In office 28 September 1846 – 28 April 1848
- Monarch: Abdulmejid I
- Preceded by: Mehmed Emin Rauf Pasha
- Succeeded by: Ibrahim Sarim Pasha

Personal details
- Born: 13 March 1800 Constantinople, Ottoman Empire
- Died: 7 January 1858 (aged 57) Constantinople, Ottoman Empire

Mustafa Reşid Pasha (Ottoman Turkish: مصطفی رشید پاشا; transliterated Mustafa Reshid Pasha; 13 March 1800 – 7 January 1858) was an Ottoman Turkish statesman and diplomat, known best as the chief architect behind the imperial Ottoman government reforms known as Tanzimat.

Born in Constantinople in 1800, Mustafa Reşid entered public service at an early age and rose rapidly, becoming ambassador to France (1834) and to the United Kingdom (1836), minister for foreign affairs (1837), and once again ambassador to the United Kingdom (1838) and to France (1841). In the settlement of the Oriental Crisis of 1840, and during the Crimean War and the ensuing peace negotiations, he rendered important diplomatic services to the Ottoman state. He returned a third time as ambassador to France in 1843. Between 1845 and 1857, he held the office of Grand Vizier six times.

One of the greatest and most versatile statesmen of his time, thoroughly acquainted with European politics and well-versed in national and international affairs, he was a convinced partisan for reform and the principal author of the legislative remodeling of the Ottoman administration known as Tanzimat. His efforts to promote reforms within the government led to the advancement of the careers of many other reformers, such as Fuad Pasha and Mehmed Emin Âli Pasha.

== Early life ==
Mustafa Reşid was born on 13 March 1800. His father, Mustafa Efendi, worked as a civil servant, but died when Mustafa Reşid was only ten. Mustafa had been attending a madrasa in hopes of becoming a religious leader. However, when his father died, Reşid was forced to end his education in the madrassa in order to live with his uncle, Ispartalı Ali Pasha, who at the time was a court chamberlain under Sultan Mahmud II, and eventually Grand Vizier. Reşid would then study at a scribal institution. When Ali Pasha was promoted to governor of Morea Eyalet in 1816, Reşid traveled with him.

== Early political life ==
=== Greek War of Independence ===
During the Greek War of Independence between 1820 and 1822, which occurred during his uncle's second term as governor of Morea and had the support of major European countries, Reşid acted as the seal carrier for the Grand Vizier and commander-in-chief, Seyyid Ali Pasha. During the war, Reşid noted for the first time several key points that would majorly influence his later political life. First, he noted that Ottoman institutions required major reform, especially needing a modernized army like that of Muhammad Ali Pasha, who had led the Egyptian army in support of the Ottomans against the Greek rebels. Secondly, he realized that foreign European assistance and support was essential for the continuation of the empire.

=== In the office of the Foreign Minister ===
After being removed from his position, along with all the followers of Seyyid Ali Pasha following his rout and dismissal as commander-in-chief, Mustafa Reşid landed a job in the Ottoman Porte working as a clerk under the Foreign Minister. He quickly found the respect and praise of his superiors and rose up the ranks. During the Russo-Turkish War (1828–29), Reşid worked sending reports to Istanbul on the war. His good work during the war found him the attention of the Sultan, Mahmud II, who promoted Reşid into the Amedi Odasi, where he worked as the secretariat for incoming correspondence to the Porte. At the conclusion of the war, Mustafa Reşid was appointed as secretary to the Ottoman delegation to the Peace talks in Adrianople (Edirne) in 1829.

During this time, he became a follower of Pertew Pasha, his superior in the office of incoming correspondence. Pertew Pasha held strong pro-British policies and relationship with the British ambassador Lord Ponsonby. Reşid, would also accompany Pertew during the negotiations in Egypt with the rebellious Muhammad Ali Pasha. Muhammad Ali took notice of Reşid's prowess as a diplomat and scribe and offered the young bureaucrat a superior position among the Egyptian administration, but Reşid denied the offer. By 1832, Reşid had been appointed to the position of amedçi, or Receiver, which was the head of the incoming correspondence secretariat. His familiarity with Egyptian affairs landed him the role of talking with Muhammad Ali's son, Ibrahim Pasha, after he routed Ottoman forces at Konya and reached Kütahya in western Anatolia by 1833. However, Reşid faced backlash after appointing Ibrahaim Pasha as the tax collector for the district of Adana, along with making him governor of Damascus and Aleppo.

== Foreign interaction ==
=== Ambassador to Paris, 1834–1836 ===
Mustafa Reşid was first sent to Paris in 1834 with the task of regaining Algeria from the recent French occupation. Although he ultimately failed, he would remain in Paris as a permanent ambassador until being transferred to London in 1836.

=== Ambassador to London, 1836–1838 ===
Reşid transferred to the Ottoman Embassy in London where he created strong ties with the British Government, especially the London Diplomat Ponsonby who his Mentor, Pertew Pasha, had strong ties with as well. However, his major achievement during his stint as ambassador was gaining the support of the British Government for the Sultan against Muhammad Ali in Egypt. After being appointed Foreign Minister in 1838, as well as given the title of pasha, Reşid Pasha returned again to London in order to form a defensive alliance against Muhammad Ali and his Egyptian forces. Although the talks materialized into nothing, on 16 August Reşid Pasha did manage to negotiate the Treaty of Balta Liman which was a commercial treaty between the Ottoman Empire and Britain. The treaty allowed for British goods within the Ottoman markets and also promised to end state monopolies within the Ottoman Empire.

=== Oriental Crisis of 1840 ===
When Muhammad Ali moved to occupy Syria with his Egyptian army led by his son Ibrahim, then Grand Vizier of Egypt, Hüsrev Pasha conceded not only Syria but also Egypt and Adana as well. Mustafa Reşid quickly realized the errors in Hüsrev Pasha's actions, which would have led to the destruction of the Ottoman Empire and inevitable Russian domination, and gained the support of the British due to his strong ties from his previous ambassadorship. The French, who supported the Egyptians due to their desire to gain more influence in the region after the conquest of Algeria, went up against the other Great Powers: England, Austria, Prussia, and Russia, who supported the Ottoman Empire. Mustafa Reşid, now Foreign Minister, played a key role in the crisis. Throughout the crisis, Mustafa Reşid remained on the side of the Great Powers and consistently refused a direct settlement without the involvement of the Great Powers, much to the disappointment of Egypt and France.

However, unbeknownst to the Great Powers, Mustafa Reşid, with approval from the Sultan, had drafted a settlement by the summer 1840 due to his impatience with the Great Powers' inability to reach an agreement. This secret settlement would grant Egypt to Muhammad Ali as a hereditary state along with the provinces of Acre, Saida, and Tripoli, a position that could be passed down to his sons and grandsons. The condition was that none of them could accumulate any more provinces, and after their deaths the provinces would return to Ottoman control. This plan was never put into place due to the London Convention of 1840, however.

After the London Crisis, Mustafa Reşid received threats from the French embassy that if they were to ratify it, France would actively support the rebellious Egyptian Governor. Reşid ignored the threats and the Sublime Porte went on to sign the conference. After Muhammad Ali's refusal to sign the London Convention of 1840, all the Great Power diplomats met with Reşid Pasha in order to draft Ali Pasha's removal from office much to the dismay of their respective countries. After a swift military intervention that led to the defeat of Egyptian forces in Syria, Commodore Napier, leader of the allied forces, held a peace convention of his own with Muhammad Ali, which was met with great reprisal from Mustafa Reşid and the other diplomats. On 11 December 1840, Muhammad Ali Pasha finally submitted to the sultan and pledged his allegiance to the Sublime Porte.

=== Ambassador to Paris, 1841–1845 ===
After the conclusion of the Oriental Crisis, Muhammad Ali Pasha bribed the Ottoman Porte to remove Mustafa Reşid Pasha from his post as Foreign Minister. He returned to his post as Ambassador to Paris soon after where he mainly focused his efforts on solving the Lebanon Question, which resulted from a dispute between the Maronite Christians and Druze Muslims of Mount Lebanon.

=== Crimean War ===
==== Escalation of crisis ====
At the start of 1853, Mustafa Reşid held no political office. In 1852–53, tensions rose between Russia and France over the Holy Lands in Palestine. Russian diplomat Alexander Menshikov, who had been sent on special mission to Istanbul in 1853 to restore the privileges inside the Ottoman Empire that Russia had enjoyed for centuries, used Reşid Pasha, who he thought to be favorable to Christians due to the Rose Garden Edict of 1839 but was currently out of office, to talk with the Sultan. Yet, Menshikov failed to realize that Reşid Pasha had remained close with his British ties, especially Ambassador Stratford, and held anti-Russian beliefs. After the presentation of the Russian demands to the Sublime Porte on 5 May 1853 and the subsequent rejection of them on 10 May, Reşid, with the help of Ambassador Stratford as well as that of Menshikov, gained back his position of Foreign Minister. Reşid immediately tried stalling the Russian diplomat in order to ensure the support of his fellow ministers. After another five-day delay, on 15 May the Sublime Porte again rejected the Russian proposition which led to the evacuation of the Russian embassy and the end of Russian-Ottoman diplomacy on 21 May. During this time, Reşid met one-on-one several times with while also writing to both Menshikov and Stratford. In Menshikov's writings, he described Reşid as being almost embarrassed to talk about the unanimous rejection of the Russian proposal and had also given the Russians a Turkish counter proposal, on which he seemed ashamed to present since he explained that he had no ability to revise them. Also according to Menshikov, Reşid had clearly wanted to renew negotiations, but had been advised otherwise by Lord Stratford.

==== Vienna Note ====
In late July 1853, diplomats of the four major powers, France, Britain, Austria and Prussia met in Vienna and created their own solution to the Russian-Turkish crisis using a previous French proposal that had already been accepted by the Tsar. The Vienna Note, as it was known, was accepted by the governments of all four of the neutral powers and by Russia, but was met with swift outcry in the Sublime Porte, led by Mustafa Reşid Pasha. The Ottomans had already presented their own ultimatum, drafted by Reşid Pasha, to the Russian Ambassador Nesselrode which reached the Vienna Conference a day after the completion of their proposal. Reşid Pasha was furious that the British governments had gone behind their backs, and were now trying to force them to concede their sovereignty. He would also draft several amendments to the Vienna Note after begging for Stratford's support which stressed the sovereignty of the Ottoman Empire against Russian advances, and only with these changes did he and several other Ottoman diplomats agree to the Vienna Note. Russia, who had been waiting for Ottoman acceptance of the Vienna Note, rejected the Ottoman modifications, and peace seemed to be impossible.

==== Declaration of war ====
On 26 September, following the Russian advances in the Balkans, the Sublime Porte held a two-day conference to determine a solution to the Russian problem, whether it be war or diplomacy. While many of the officials were favorable to war, Reşid Pasha cautioned them. He warned that the state was not prepared militarily to fight Russia in a war. However, he also added that it was the Porte's decision even though the European Powers had advised them to refrain from waging war. He also remarked that the European powers are not against war but would need convincing to keep their forces in support of the Ottoman enterprise. When asked about the Christian subjects and their loyalty, Reşid responded that Christians, like Muslims had internal differences and would not support one another solely due to their religion. Although he originally seemed to have been against the war and for diplomacy, by the end of the meetings Reşid is quoted as saying, "It is better to die with arms in hand than to die with tied hands. God willing, we will be victorious and destroy the harmful treaties as well". Stratford had even warned Reşid Pasha that England and France would not stand behind the Ottomans if they started the war. However, it appears that Reşid's arguments had persuaded the other officials, and at the end of the conference, Reşid drafted a resolution for war which was sent to and accepted by the Sultan on 30 September and 4 October the Ottoman Empire officially declared War on Russia. According to Certev Pasha, Reşid Pasha wrote this on the purpose of the Crimean War, "The unique objective of the Sublime Porte, the salutary aim that she entertains, is to come to the end of the war completely protected from any exterior anxiety, in order to busy herself solely with interior regulations to assure the well-well being of the empire by the perfecting of the progressive system of administration, by the just amelioration of the condition of all classes of the subjects, and by the development of her commerce and industry without any impediment; and as we have obviously just seen that the treaty of the year 1841 doesn’t suffice to give her security in the foreign quarter, the Sublime Porte believes it her duty to submit, as of now, to her allies, the necessity of making another treaty to serve as a complement to that one."

==== During the war ====
Reşid Pasha immediately immersed himself in gaining European support. On 8 October 1853, only four days following the declaration of war, he petitioned the British and French Ambassadors for their support in the form of naval vessels in the straits of Dardanelles. On 20 October, the requests were fulfilled and both fleets were sailing to the straits. Two days prior, on 18 October, Reşid Pasha had sent orders for the Ottoman forces to commence fighting which began on 23 October. In December, following an Ottoman naval defeat at the bay of Sinop and rumors of Reşid Pasha's peace negotiations, students began revolting in the streets of Istanbul forcing Reşid and many of his followers to hide for their lives. Reşid submitted his resignation immediately but it was not accepted. Reşid Pasha's rivalry with one of his prior proteges, Mehmed Emin Ali, came to fruition during this time period as well. It is believed that Mehmed Ali, who favored the war, had helped instigate the students. Reşid, with the help of Lord Stratford, had Mehmed deposed and even exiled to Kastamonu after it was discovered that he had held large sums of money from the Ottoman government. Over the Spring of 1854, Reşid used his position as Foreign Minister to coordinate Ottoman naval movements with France and Britain. He also was able to officially drag both Britain and France into the war with a military alliance in March 1854. In November of that year, he was rewarded with an appointment as Grand Vizier. However, in May 1855, only a few short months later he was removed from office, leaving him out of the rest of the war and the ensuing peace talks as well.

== Domestic affairs ==
=== Edict of Gülhane ===
Mustafa Reşid Pasha is credited with playing a leading role in the authorship of the decree that started the Tanzimat era. The Hatt-ı Şerif of Gülhane, known as the "Edict of Gülhane" or "Rose Garden Edict", was read in the rose garden of the Topkapi Palace among foreign diplomats and the sultan Abdulmecid. The edict was the result of the combination of several powerful circumstances. First, after the death of Sultan Mahmud II in 1838, his son Abdulmecid rose to the throne with completely different ideals from his father; unlike his father, who focused on creating a stronger and more powerful throne, Abdulmecid wanted to enact liberal reforms to bring the Ottoman Empire along the lines of other European monarchies. Secondly, up to this point Mustafa Reşid Pasha had been well versed in Orthodox Islam due to his apostleship to Pertev Pasha. Third, Reşid Pasha and many of the other Porte officials had been well versed in European political thought and institutions due to their extended connections as current and former ambassadors. In fact, on 11 August 1839, while still in London serving as ambassador, Mustafa Reşid Pasha sent a confidential memorandum to then British ambassador Lord Palmerston with whom he had a close relationship. The memorandum was not an Ottoman document but only the personal views of Reşid Pasha. He told Lord Palmerston that reform within the Ottoman Sublime Porte was greatly needed and finally doable following the death of Mahmud II and the rise of the young Abdulmecid, who needed to be led in the right direction. Reşid Pasha also wrote that the protection and security of the people was mandatory if they were to accept the new reforms he wanted to institute, since their previous rejections were based on the fear of further prosecution by the corrupt Sublime Porte. Furthermore, he put forth that European support and cooperation was mandatory and essential for the preservation of the Ottoman state. All of these thoughts would later appear in the Rose Garden Edict only a few months later. His main goal was to ensure the power of the sultanate while at the same time establishing a strong central bureaucracy within the Sublime Porte to indefinitely postpone the disintegration of the Ottoman Empire.

During this same time period, Reşid Pasha also conferred with Austrian diplomat Prince Metternich on government institutional reform. Another circumstance was the ongoing crisis with Muhammad Ali of Egypt. The Ottoman Empire was at this time also trying to ensure the support of the Great Powers. The Hatt-ı Şerif of Gülhane, Reşid hoped, would gain foreign and especially British support for the Ottoman Empire due to its better treatment of its subjects, especially the Christian raya. By the end of the summer 1839, the Sublime Porte held a meeting attended by Reşid Pasha, Grand Vizier Koca Hüsrev Mehmed Pasha, and other major bureaucrats. During the meeting, after reading a memorandum from the Sultan, the officials created a petition for the Sultan in which they called for the protection of individual rights and property and the end of the corruption within the government, while all new laws were to remain under the principles of shar’ia law. This petition would become the Hatt-ı Şerif of Gülhane, or the "Edict of Gülhane."

=== Reforms ===
Mustafa Reşid Pasha is credited with being the father of the Tanzimat Reforms, which lasted from 1839 with the reading of the Rose Garden Edict, to 1876 and the creation of the constitution. During this period, Reşid Pasha would serve six times as Grand Vizier and several times as Foreign Minister. Reşid thought that the Ottoman existence was based on four pillars: Islam, the Osman dynasty, the hükümet which was the Ottoman government, and the existence of the capital, Istanbul. He wrote "We do not possess the necessary [military] power to maintain the territorial integrity of our state. Consequently, it is our [geographical] position which shall help us preserve [that integrity]. [In order to do so] we must build a good administration. The foreign states shall not leave us in peace. All states aspire to possess Constantinople but the city is indivisible. If we are not able to produce a good administration [the foreign powers] will establish a joint administration [in Constantinople] too".

Immediately following the reading of the Hatti-Sherif of Gülhane, Reşid Pasha presented the sultan with two propositions concerning the Supreme Council of Judicial Ordinances. First, he wanted to combine the Dar-ı Şura-yı Bab-ı Âli, which advised the Office of the Foreign Minister, with the Supreme Council, so that there was only one institution advising the Sublime Porte eliminating the frequent contradictions. The Supreme Council would also be based out of the Sublime Porte compound, indicating the major influence the Tanzimat reformers would have over the drafting of new legislature. Also in 1841, Reşid Pasha renamed the new army, which had replaced the Janissaries after their fall in 1826, the Asakir-i Nizamiye-i Şihane. Reşid Pasha also created a new court of justice within the also newly established Ministry of Commerce, which he hoped would promote foreign trade with the Ottoman Empire. The new court would judge on commercial disputes. At the same time he created a new commercial code dealing with bankruptcies, partnerships and bills of exchange which had largely been based on French models. Upon questioning by the ulema, Reşid responded that Islam had no pertinence to these codes leading to his immediate removal from office as Foreign Minister.

Starting in 1846, during Reşid Pasha's first two terms as Grand Vizier, the Tanzimat Reforms were at their peak. He focused on creating liberal economic policies, again established commercial courts and laws based on French models, as well as finally abolished slavery and the slave trade within the Empire. Reşid also strove to improve the educational system. In 1846 he created the Meclis-i Maarif, a committee of education that was designed to reduce the ulema's influence on education, essentially creating a secular system of learning. In 1847, the Sublime Porte established several middle schools as well as a school for teachers in 1848. In 1852, he established an Academy for Sciences, Endjümen-i Daniş, which had been modeled on a French academy. Through this institution, Reşid Pasha hoped to conglomerate an extension of texts that could later be used when an Ottoman University would be created. He also sought the simplification of the Turkish language, which can be seen in his writings about the Academy for Sciences, in which he states, "…insistence is [hereby] placed on the drafting of scientific and technological books written in a simple style and fitted to the needs of popular intelligence so as to provide the means of widening and completing its instruction." In 1846, Reşid ordered for the establishment of an archival system in the Sublime Porte, called the Hazine-yi Evrak.

During his third stint as Grand Vizier which only lasted six months, again reformed the Supreme Council which he stripped of its powers regarding legislation. He created the Meclis-i Âli-i Tanzimat, or the Supreme Council of Reorganization, to take over that responsibility. It was officially charged with discussing reforms that would lead to the prosperity of the state.

=== Criticism of Reform Edict ===
The Imperial Reform Edict, also known as the Islâhat Hatt-ı Hümâyûnu or the Ottoman Reform Edict of 1856, was written in 1856 by Britain and France with very little consultation with Ottoman officials. Roderic Davison writes of it being "in many ways the magnum opus of Lord Stratford." Reşid Pasha, at the time was out of office, so he had no influence on the edict. However, with its proclamation, he immediately came out staunchly against the edict. He believed that it was a complete overstep of foreign governments against the sovereignty and principles of the Ottoman government.

=== Grand Vizierate ===
With only an interruption of four months in 1848, Mustafa Reşid Pasha served as Grand Vizier from 1846 to 1852. These years proved to be his most productive in establishing his Tanzimat reforms. He would be disposed under foreign, especially French, pressure in January 1852 due to his strong bias to Britain.

Only two months later he was reinstalled as Grand Vizier but only to be removed once again in August, due to a rift between him and the commander of the Imperial Arsenal.

During the Crimean War, after his successful negotiation of an alliance with Britain and France, he was reinstalled as Grand Vizier in November 1854. During this short stint as Grand Vizier he continued with his reforms, but he was displaced yet again less than a year later due to his position against the Suez Canal which upset the French who again pressured the Sultan to dismiss Reşid Pasha. This dismissal resulted in his exclusion from the treaty talks following the Crimean War.

In November 1856 due to British support, Reşid Pasha returned again to the Grand Vizierate for a fifth time. For the third time, he was displaced at the hands of the French who disagreed with his position against the formation of a Rumanian state in the Principalities towards the end of July 1857.

It was not too long before Mustafa Reşid Pasha was appointed Grand Vizier for the sixth and final time on 22 October 1857. This appointment only lasted a few months, when he suffered a heart attack and died on 7 January 1858.

== Personal life and death ==
Mustafa Reşid Pasha married twice during his lifetime and had a total of five sons, one with his first wife and four with his second. One of his granddaughters, Adila Khanum, married Hussein bin Ali, King of Hejaz.

He died of a heart attack on 7 January 1858 in Constantinople, at the age of 57.

== Legacy ==
Although many of the reforms introduced under Reşid and the Tanzimat failed to take hold, his influence was widespread. The famed Ottoman poet İbrahim Şinasi (another principal author of Tanzimat) called Reşid an "apostle of civilization" and "president of virtuous people" (Millennium 65). After Reşid Pasha's death, his protégés Fuad Pasha and Mehmed Emin Ali Pasha, as well as Cevdet Pasha, continued their service to the state along with Reşid's many sons. Mehmed Ali and Fuad led the Tanzimat reforms following their leader's death. Reşid Pasha led the strengthening of the bureaucracy of the Porte while also starting the legal equality of the Empire's subjects. However, poor funds as well as inefficient leaders handicapped many of his installments. Nevertheless, his ideology was ever persistent though in the Ottoman transition from a patriarchal government to a legal one.

== Sources ==
- Abdu-Manneh, Butrus (November 1994). "The Islamic Roots of the Gülhane Rescript". Die Welt des Islams. 34 (2). Brill: 173–203. doi:10.2307/1570929. JSTOR 1570929.
- Badem, Candan (2010). The Ottoman Crimean War (1835–1836). Leiden: Brill. ISBN 978-90-04-18205-9.
- Celik, Yuksel (2009). "Mustafa Resid Pasha". Encyclopaedia of the Ottoman Empire. New York: Facts on File, Inc. ISBN 978-0-8160-6259-1.
- Curtiss, John S. (1979). Russia's Crimean War. Durham: Duke University Press.
- Figes, Orlando (2011). The Crimean War: A History. New York: Metropolitan Books. ISBN 978-0805074604.
- Halman, Talat S. (2011). A Millennium of Turkish Literature. Syracuse, NY: Syracuse UP. ISBN 978-0-8156-0958-2.
- Hanioglu, Sükrü (2008). A Brief History of the Late Ottoman Empire. Princeton, NJ: Princeton UP. ISBN 978-0-691-13452-9.
- Karpat, Kemal h. (2001). The Politicization of Islam:Reconstructing Identity, State, Faith, and Community in the Late Ottoman State. New York: Oxford University Press.
- Kinross, Lord (1977). The Ottoman Centuries. New York: William Morrow and Company.
- Mardin, Serif (April 1961). "Some Notes on an Early Phase in the Modernization of Communications in Turkey". Comparative Studies in Society and History. 3 (3). Cambridge UP: 250–271. doi:10.1017/S0010417500012214. JSTOR 177914. S2CID 143607351.
- Rich, Norman (1985). Why the Crimean War?: A Cautionary Tale. Hanover: University Press of New England.
- Saab, Ann P. (1977). The Origins of the Crimean Alliance. Charlottesville: University Press of Virginia. ISBN 0-8139-0699-7.
- Šedivý, Miroslav (2013). Metternich, the Great Powers and the Eastern Question. Plzeň: University of West Bohemia. ISBN 978-80-261-0223-6.
- Somel, Selcuk (2012). "Mustafa Reşid Pasha". Historical Dictionary of the Ottoman Empire (2nd ed.). Lanham: The Scare Crow Press. ISBN 978-90-04-09834-3.
- Shaw, Stanford J. (January 1970). "The Central Legislative Councils in the Nineteenth Century Ottoman Reform Movement before 1876". International Journal of Middle East Studies. 1 (1). Cambridge UP: 51–84. doi:10.1017/S0020743800023904. JSTOR 162065. S2CID 159487875.
- Subaşı, Turgut (January 2011). "Volume:Ottoman relations in the nineteenth century:Mustafa Reşid Paşa's Memorandum to Palmerston,11 August 1839". International Journal of Human Sciences. 8 (1). ISSN 1303-5134.
- Wetzel, David (1985). The Crimean War: A Diplomatic History. Boulder: East European Monographs.
- Zürcher, E.J. (1995). "Res̲h̲īd Pas̲h̲a, Muṣṭafā". Encyclopaedia of Islam. Vol. 8 (New ed.). Leiden: E.J. Brill. ISBN 90-04-09834-8.

Political offices
Preceded by Mehmed Emin Rauf Pasha	Grand Vizier of the Ottoman Empire; 28 September 1846 – 28 April 1848	Succeeded by Ibrahim Sarim Pasha
Preceded by Ibrahim Sarim Pasha	Grand Vizier of the Ottoman Empire; 12 August 1848 – 26 January 1852	Succeeded by Mehmed Emin Rauf Pasha
Preceded by Mehmed Emin Rauf Pasha	Grand Vizier of the Ottoman Empire; 5 March 1852 – 5 August 1852	Succeeded by Mehmed Emin Ali Pasha
Preceded by Kıbrıslı Mehmed Emin Pasha	Grand Vizier of the Ottoman Empire; 23 November 1854 – 2 May 1855	Succeeded by Mehmed Emin Ali Pasha
Preceded by Mehmed Emin Ali Pasha	Grand Vizier of the Ottoman Empire; 1 November 1856 – 6 August 1857	Succeeded by Mustafa Naili Pasha
Preceded by Mustafa Naili Pasha	Grand Vizier of the Ottoman Empire; 22 October 1857 – 7 January 1858	Succeeded by Mehmed Emin Ali Pasha
