= Reschid Pasha =

Reschid Pasha may refer to:

- Koca Mustafa Reşid Pasha
- Reşid Mehmed Pasha
