= Ministry of Trade and Agriculture (Ottoman Empire) =

Imperial ministry of the Ottoman Empire

- (Ottoman Turkish: تجارت و زراعت نظارتی; Ticaret ve Ziraat Nezâreti

Agency overview
- Formed: 1839
- Jurisdiction: Ottoman Empire
- Headquarters: Constantinople
- Minister responsible: Ibrahim Edhem Pasha

Ministry of Trade and Agriculture (Ottoman Turkish: تجارت و زراعت نظارتی; Turkish: Ticaret ve Ziraat Nezâreti) was the name given to the ministry responsible for trade and agricultural affairs in the Ottoman Empire.

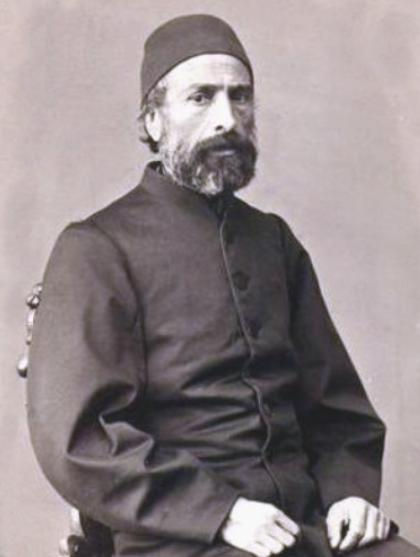
Ottoman statesman İbrahim Edhem Pasha, who served 4 times as the Minister of Trade and Agriculture, and also as Grand Vizier

In the Ottoman Empire, before the establishment of ministries (Turkish: nazırlık), the title for the person responsible for agricultural and commercial affairs in the Empire was "Arpa Emini". According to Ottoman records Hayreddin Çelebi was the first Arpa Emini [barley chief] in 1484. During the reign of Selim III, the Arpa Emini was transformed into the "Hububat ve Zahire Nazırlığı" (English: Ministry of Cereals and Rations). However, this ministry did not last long, and the title of Arpa Emini returned. Finally, in 1839, the "Ticaret ve Ziraat Nezâreti" (English: Ministry of Trade and Agriculture) was established for the first time, and Halil Rifat Pasha was appointed as its head.

The Ministry of Trade and Agriculture continued to exist until the collapse of the Ottoman Empire. However, the two were separated in various periods, and in some periods, they were merged with the Nafia Nazırlığı (English: Ministry of Public Works), and were referred to as the Ministry of Trade and Public Works. Abdüllatif Safa Bey was the last person to hold the title of Minister of Trade and Agriculture, serving from June 1921 to November 1922.

== List of ministers ==
- Ahmet Fethi Paşa (December 1839 – January 1840)
- Damad Mehmed Said Paşa (January 1840 – March 1841)
- İbrahim Sarim Paşa (June 1841 – December 1841)
- Mehmed Tahir Paşa (December 1841 – February 1845)
- Hüseyin Bey (February 1845 – September 1845)
- Damat Gürcü Halil Rifat Paşa (September 1845 – December 1845)
- Arif Paşa (16 January 1846 – 22 April 1846)
- İbrahim Sarim Paşa (22 April 1846 – 20 July 1846)
- Hasan Rıza Paşa (20 July 1846 – 13 May 1848)
- Mehmed Kamil Paşa (13 May 1848 – 1 July 1848)
- Süleyman Refet Paşa (1 July 1848 – 13 March 1849)
- Hekim İsmail Paşa (13 March 1849 – 10 January 1851)
- Mehmed İzzet Paşa (10 October 1851 – 9 January 1852)
- Yusuf Kâmil Paşa (9 November 1852 – 26 February 1853)
- Mehmed Namık Paşa (26 February 1853 – 11 September 1854)
- Yusuf Kâmil Paşa (11 September 1854 – 11 January 1855)
- Musa Saffeti Paşa (11 January 1855 – 12 January 1856)
- Hekim İsmail Paşa (12 January 1856 – 27 March 1858)
- Ali Galib Paşa (27 March 1858 – 29 August 1858)
- Mahmud Nedim Paşa (29 August 1858 – 9 January 1860)
- İbrahim Edhem Paşa (9 January 1860 – 17 July 1861)
- Mehmed Esad Saffet Paşa (17 July 1861 – 16 February 1863)
- İbrahim Edhem Paşa (16 February 1863 – 13 July 1863)
- Mehmed Esad Saffet Paşa (13 July 1863 – 19 March 1865)
- İbrahim Edhem Paşa (19 March 1865 – 19 July 1866)
- İbrahim Halil Paşa (19 July 1866 – 14 May 1867)
- Mehmed Esad Saffet Paşa (14 May 1867 – 1 June 1867)
- Ali Kabuli Paşa (1 June 1867 – 10 September 1871)
- İbrahim Edhem Paşa (10 September 1871 – 17 June 1872)
- Rüştü Paşa (1 September 1872 – 2 August 1874)
- Ali Kabuli Paşa (2 August 1874 – 25 October 1875)
- Damat Mahmud Celaleddin Paşa (25 October 1875 – 4 April 1876)
- Sadullah Paşa (4 April 1876 – 30 May 1876)
- Mehmed Halet Paşa (16 October 1876 – 6 February 1877)
- Ohannes Çamiç Efendi (6 February 1877 – 10 November 1877)
- Münif Paşa (10 November 1877 – 18 April 1878)
- Ohannes Çamiç Efendi (18 April 1878 – 4 October 1878)
- Ahmet Cevdet Paşa (1 October 1878 – 19 October 1879)
- Cenanizade Mehmed Kadri Paşa (19 October 1879 – December 1879)
- Bedros Kuyumcuyan Efendi (June 1880 – 12 September 1880)
- Köse Mehmed Raif Paşa (12 September 1880 – 25 November 1882)
- Abdüllatif Suphi Paşa (25 November 1882 – 25 September 1885)
- İsmail Hakkı Paşa (25 September 1885 – 19 December 1886)
- Mustafa Zihni Paşa (19 December 1886 – 10 May 1890)
- Köse Mehmed Raif Paşa (10 May 1890 – 3 September 1891)
- Mahmud Celaleddin Paşa (4 September 1891 – 11 September 1891)
- Hüseyin Tevfik Paşa (4 September 1891 – November 1895)
- Selim Melhame Paşa (November 1895–1908)
- Mehmet Tevfik Paşa (19 July 1908 – 24 July 1908)
- Mehmed Ziya Paşa (3 August 1908 – 7 August 1908)
- Gabriel Noradunkyan (7 August 1908 – January 1910)
- Dimitraki Mavrokordato Efendi (24 July 1908 – 22 April 1909)
- Bedros Hallaçyan Efendi (22 April 1909 – 21 September 1911)
- Kirkor Sinapyan Efendi (21 September 1911 – 20 November 1911)
- Aristidi Paşa (20 November 1911 – 9 July 1912)
- Mustafa Reşit Paşa (9 July 1912 – 11 January 1913)
- Mehmed Celal Bey (11 January 1913 – 4 June 1913)
- Süleyman el-Büstani Efendi (4 June 1913 – 23 October 1914)
- Ahmed Nesimi Bey (23 October 1914 – 22 October 1916)
- Mustafa Şeref Bey (22 October 1916 – October 1918)
- Çürüksulu Ziya Paşa (October 1918 – 11 November 1918)
- Kostaki Vayanis Efendi (11 November 1918 – 24 February 1919)
- Abdullah Lami Bey (24 February 1919 – 4 March 1919)
- İbrahim Edhem Bey (4 March 1919 – 11 August 1919)
- Tahir Hayreddin Paşa (11 August 1919 – 11 September 1919)
- Bağdatlı Mehmed Hadi Paşa (11 September 1919 – February 1920)
- Abdurrahman Şeref Efend (February 1920 – 8 March 1920)
- Mehmed Ziyaeddin Bey (8 March 1920 – 5 April 1920)
- Hüseyin Remzi Paşa (5 April 1920 – 31 July 1920)
- İbrahim Edhem Bey (June 1920 – 31 July 1920)
- Artin Cemal Bey (31 July 1920 – September 1920)
- Bağdatlı Mehmed Hadi Paşa (September 1920 – 21 October 1920)
- Hüseyin Kazım Bey (21 October 1920 – 12 June 1921)
- Abdüllatif Safa Bey (12 June 1921 – 1 November 1922)
