= Kıbrıslı Mehmed Emin Pasha =

Grand Vizier of the Ottoman Empire (1854, 1859, 1860-1861)

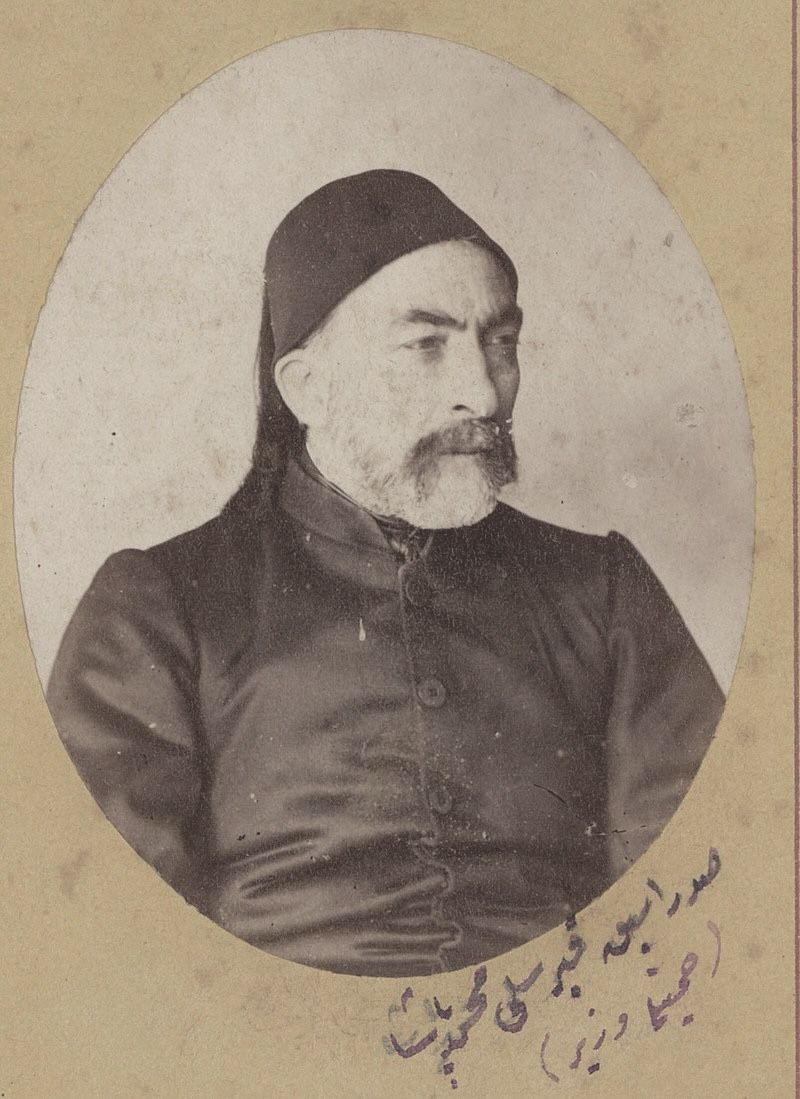
- Born: 1813; Nicosia, Eyalet of Cyprus, Ottoman Empire
- Died: 1871 (aged 57–58); Istanbul, Ottoman Empire

Kıbrıslı Mehmed Emin Pasha ("Mehmed Emin Pasha the Cypriot"; 1813–1871) was an Ottoman civil servant and statesman of Turkish Cypriot origin, who served at the top post of Grand Vizier during three different times under the reign of the sultan Abdulmejid I.

He was in favor in reforming the Ottoman Empire into a constitutional monarchy. He however died before the first Ottoman constitution came into existence.

== Career ==
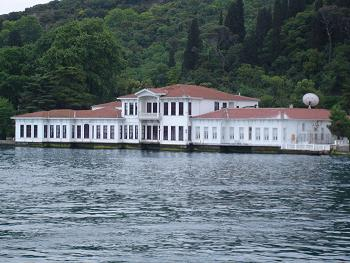
Kıbrıslı Mehmed Emin Pasha mansion (yalı) in Kandilli, Boğaziçi, Istanbul, acquired in 1840 and largely extended by the Pasha and owned today by his descendants

His uncle was in charge of Mahmud II's private treasury, secured him for palace service while he was young, and he then entered the Hassa regiment (1833–1834). He then studied abroad, in France, at the Sultan's expense. He served in a military capacity, as serasker, in Acre (1844–1845), Jerusalem (1845–1847; during which time he suppressed a serious Bedouin revolt), Tirnova (1847), and then Belgrade (1847–1848). During this period, many rumours circulated about his mismanagement practices, but they were dismissed by the Sultan as gossip. He was appointed as a vizier in 1848.

In 1850–51, Mehmed Emin served as governor of the Eyalet of Aleppo, at the end of which he was appointed müşir (field marshal), in the province of Syria.

His periods of administration were for the first term between 29 May and 23 November 1854, the second term between 18 November 1859 and 24 December 1859, and for the last term between 28 May 1860 and 6 August 1861. As such, he was also the last grand vizier under Abdülmecid.

Like many other prominent Ottoman statesmen of the Tanzimat period, Mehmed Emin Pasha rose from the Dragoman's office (Turkish: Tercüme Odası), largely Turkified by the 19th century, and climbing through the foreign office of the Ottoman Empire, held consecutive ambassadorial and governorship posts.

Mehmed Emin Pasha died in his yalı in Kandilli, Istanbul, in 1871.

After his death, his first wife, Melek Hanım, née Marie Dejean (formerly the wife of Julius Michael Millingen), wrote her memoirs of the harem, in the 19th century context of that institution, as well as a controversial account of the high spheres of the Ottoman society, published in London in 1872, treating much the same period as the memoirs of Leyla Saz, written much later in the 1920s.

== See also ==
- List of Ottoman grand viziers

== Bibliography ==
- Melek Hanim (1872): Thirty years in the harem: or, The autobiography of Melek-Hanum, wife of H.H. Kibrizli-Mehemet-Pasha

Preceded by Mustafa Naili Pasha	Grand Vizier; 30 May 1854 – 24 November 1854	Succeeded by Mustafa Reshid Pasha
Preceded by Mehmed Emin Ali Pasha	Grand Vizier; 8 October 1859 – 24 December 1859	Succeeded by Mehmed Rushdi Pasha
Preceded by Mehmed Rushdi Pasha	Grand Vizier; 24 May 1860 – 6 August 1861	Succeeded by Mehmed Emin Âli Pasha
