= Mehmed Emin Âli Pasha =

Ottoman statesman and Grand Vizier (1815–1871)

Mehmed Emin Âlî Pasha
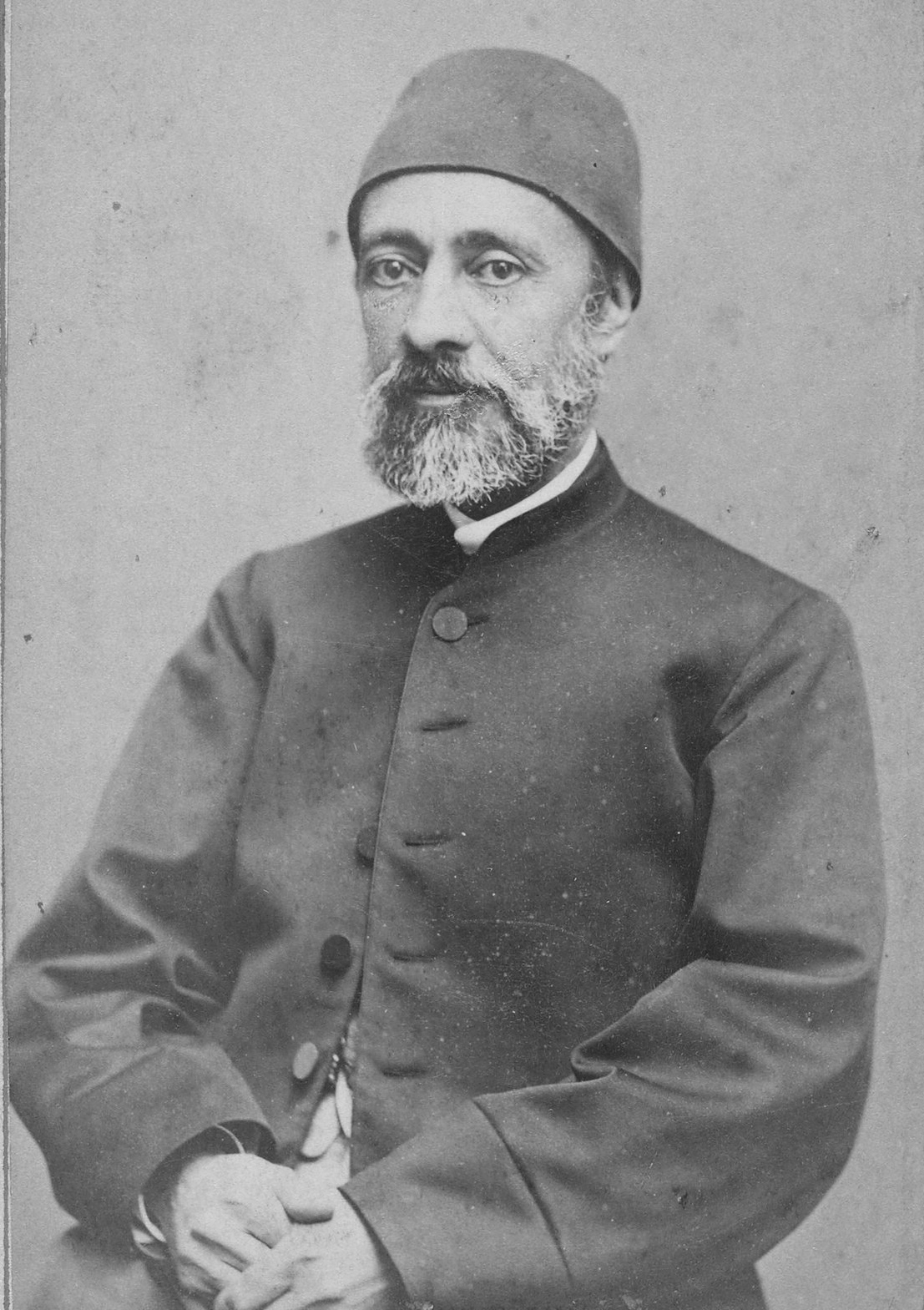

Grand Vizier of the Ottoman Empire
- In office 11 February 1867 – 7 September 1871
- Monarch: Abdulaziz
- Preceded by: Mehmed Rushdi Pasha
- Succeeded by: Mahmud Nedim Pasha
- In office 6 August 1861 – 22 November 1861
- Monarch: Abdulaziz
- Preceded by: Kıbrıslı Mehmed Emin Pasha
- Succeeded by: Mehmed Fuad Pasha
- In office 7 January 1858 – 18 October 1859
- Monarch: Abdulmejid I
- Preceded by: Mustafa Reşid Pasha
- Succeeded by: Kıbrıslı Mehmed Emin Pasha
- In office 2 May 1855 – 1 November 1856
- Monarch: Abdulmejid I
- Preceded by: Mustafa Reşid Pasha
- Succeeded by: Mustafa Reşid Pasha
- In office 6 August 1852 – 3 October 1852
- Monarch: Abdulmejid I
- Preceded by: Mustafa Reşid Pasha
- Succeeded by: Damat Mehmed Ali Pasha

Regent of the Ottoman Empire
- In office 21 June 1867 – 7 August 1867
- Monarch: Abdulaziz

Personal details
- Born: 5 March 1815 Constantinople, Ottoman Empire
- Died: 7 September 1871 (aged 56) Constantinople, Ottoman Empire

Mehmed Emin Âlî Pasha, also spelled as Mehmed Emin Aali (5 March 1815 – 7 September 1871), commonly known as Ali Pasha, was a Turkish–Ottoman statesman during the Tanzimat period, best known as the architect of the Ottoman Reform Edict of 1856, and for his role in the Treaty of Paris (1856) that ended the Crimean War. From obscure origins as the son of a doorkeeper, Âli Pasha rose through the ranks of the Ottoman state and became the Minister of Foreign Affairs for a short time in 1840, and again in 1846. He became Grand Vizier for a few months in 1852. Between 1855 and 1871 he alternated between the two jobs, ultimately holding the position of Foreign Minister seven times and Grand Vizier five times in his lifetime. Âli Pasha was widely regarded as a deft and able statesman, and often credited with preventing an early break-up of the empire.

Âli Pasha advocated for a western style of reform to modernize the empire, including secularization of the state and education and improvements to civil liberties. He advocated for an Ottoman nationalism that would replace diverse ethnic and religious loyalties. To that end, non-Muslims started to serve in government, with a couple becoming cabinet ministers. In foreign policy, following the Crimean War the Ottoman Empire joined the Concert of Europe. Troops were withdrawn from Serbia, and the Cretan revolt was suppressed. His egalitarian reforms, dealings with Christian powers, and increasingly authoritarian regime were not without controversy, opponents of which coalesced around the Young Ottomans. After his death in 1871, a period of chaos resulted as reactionaries took control over the government, leading to the Great Eastern Crisis.

== Early life ==
Mehmed Emin Âli Pasha was born on March 5, 1815, in Constantinople into a home of modest means. He was born the son of a shopkeeper, with no formal education except three years of primary school. It was in primary school that Âli Pasha learned to read and write in addition to memorizing some surahs of the Quran. Nonetheless, Âli Pasha did continue to educate himself, including teaching himself French. He started his lengthy public service career at the age of 14 as a clerk in the Imperial Council. The next year Âli Pasha was transferred to the records department of the Imperial Council. Once again Âli Pasha was transferred a year later, this time to the Translation Office.

== Translation Office ==
The Translation Office (Turkish: Tercüme Odası, known in English as the office of the "dragoman" from the Turkish tercüme, "translation") was set up in response to Greek independence. This was due to the fact that, prior to Greek independence, many Greeks had acted as translators in government business. Consequently, the Greek uprising for independence resulted in an exodus of the Greek translators working for the government and left a demand for translators. In addition, internal affairs including, the defeat of Ottoman armies at the hand of the Egyptians and the Treaty of Hünkâr İskelesi with the Russians, diplomacy became more important. Such developments not only led to growth within the Translation office, but also to higher scrutiny of the Translation Office and it increased salaries. The job, however, didn't just improve Âli Paha's lot in life; it also impacted his future policies. For instance, Âli Pasha and others in the Translation Office, such as Âli Pasha's future partner in reform, Mehmed Fuad Pasha, got needed experience in the world of diplomacy through the work of translation in that very field. This exposure to the diplomatic realm distanced Mehmed Emin Âli Pasha from the values of traditional Ottoman society while at the same time developed within him the values of a rational bureaucrat.

== Under Mustafa Reşid Pasha ==
In 1835 Âli Pasha was appointed second secretary to the Embassy in Vienna, where he studied the organization of the Austrian Empire. A few years later Âli Pasha found himself as counselor to Mustafa Reşid Pasha. Although, Mustafa Reşid Pasha was only ambassador to the Court of Saint James, better known as the royal court of Britain, he would be appointed Grand Vizier in 1839 and began a period of reform in the Ottoman Empire, known as the Tanzimat period. Mustafa left Âli Pasha in charge while he headed back to the Ottoman Empire to take his position as Grand Vizier. This development eventually would lead to Âli Pasha being made the official ambassador and he would continue to rise higher and higher in political office. When Âli Pasha himself was made Grand Vizier in 1852, he was the youngest ever appointed.

== The Crimean War ==
In 1854 during the Crimean War Âli Pasha was recalled from retirement in order to take the portfolio of foreign affairs for a second time under Reshid Pasha and in this capacity took part in 1855 in the conference of Vienna. In 1855 he again became the Grand Vizier for one year, an office he filled no less than five times; in that role he represented the Porte at the Congress of Paris in 1856 and signed the peace treaty that ended the Crimean War.

== Âli Pasha as an Ambassador ==
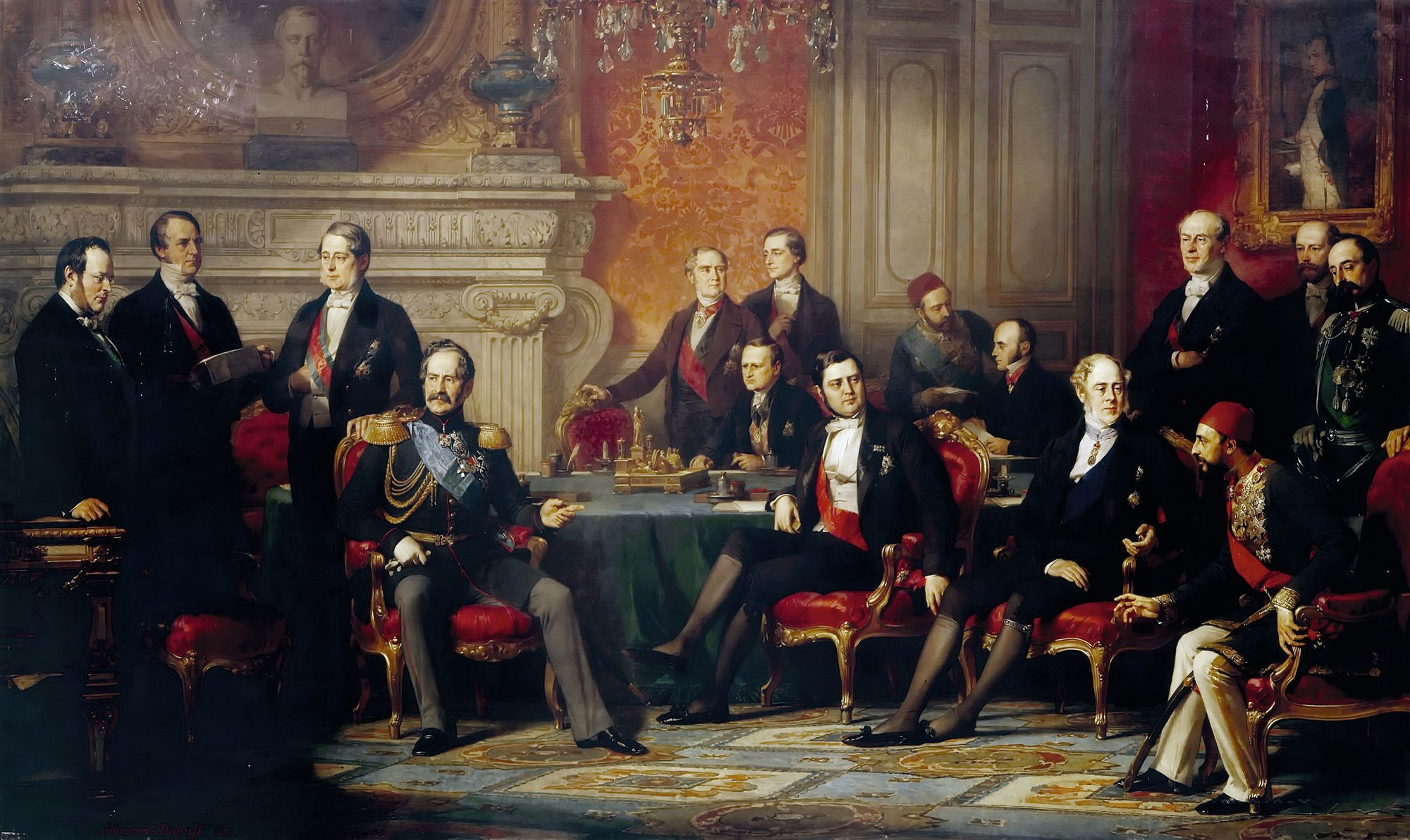
The Congress of Paris by Edouard Dubufe. Mehmed Emin Âli Pasha (on the far right) at the Congress of Paris (1856)

In 1846 Mehmed Emin Âli Pasha was made Minister of Foreign Affairs under Mustafa Pasha which is no surprise given his well honed skill in diplomacy. Sultan Abdulaziz, who often clashed with Âli Pasha over the powers of the Grand Vizier, admitted that he could not replace such a man so recognized in Europe. It was during his role as ambassador that Âli Pasha promoted friendship with England and Second French Empire as well as incorporating western practices into the Ottoman Empire. For example, based on his experience of the education system of France, Âli Pasha laid the foundation of the prestigious Galatasaray High School in its modern form, where children of minority religions would be taught amongst Muslim students. This was done so that people of other religions would cease to see the Turks as enemies. Âli Pasha's responsibilities and recognition increased further when he was chosen as lead delegate for the peace talks, while being appointed Grand Vizier again in the 1855 Congress of Vienna, following the Crimean war. It was there that he formatted a peace settlement that included the Ottoman Empire into the Concert of Europe, a balance of power among European nations, and that the other powers of the Concert of Europe would respect the territories of the Ottoman Empire and its independence. Subsequently, it was altered somewhat and incorporated into Article seven of the 1856 treaty of Paris.

== Edict of 1856 ==
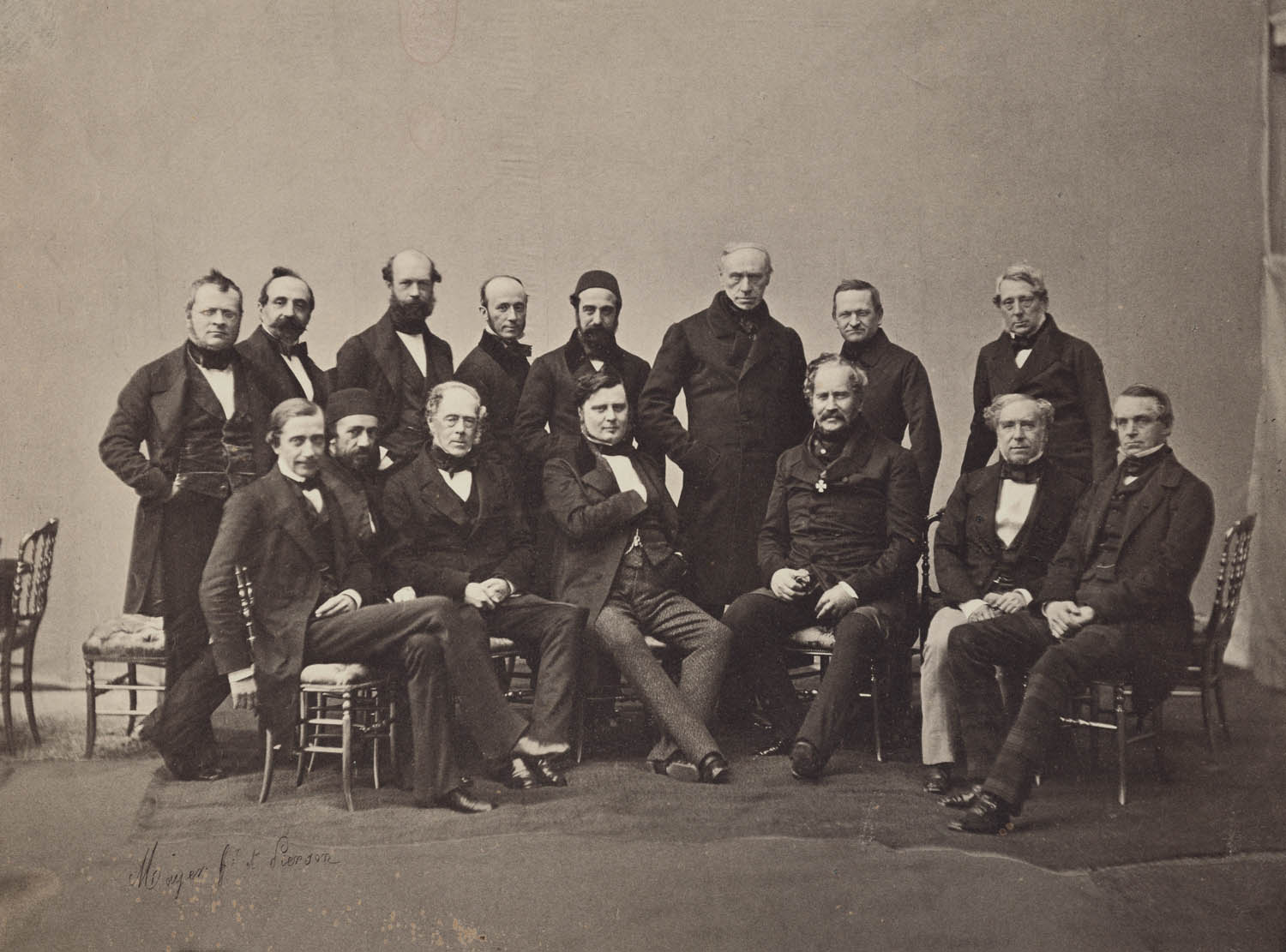
Participants of the Congress of Paris, 1856

Although the intervention of England, France, and Sardinia in the Crimean War, in addition to the Treaty of Paris in 1856, saved the Ottoman Empire from Russia, the Ottoman Empire was now facing external pressure from its saviors to treat all their citizens equally regardless of religion. In response, Grand Vizier Âli Pasha formulated the Hatt-i Humayun reform edict of 1856. This promised equality to everyone in front of the law, opened civil offices to all subjects, guaranteed the security of life and property of non-Muslims and promised no one would be forced to change their religion. As a result, there was an increase of Christian missionaries in the Ottoman Empire. This created a concern that Muslims would convert to Christianity and get out of military service. In response to this fear, the Ottoman Empire ended up making a policy that conversion would not be allowed. In short, converts to Christianity could be arrested and punished. The new freedoms also were unpopular with some non-Muslim members of the Ottoman population. Christian subjects, for instance, were angry for being put on the same level as Jews.

== Âli Pasha versus the opposition ==
Âli Pasha constantly battled the sultan on the powers of the Grand Vezir during his time in office. He not only insisted that the sultan defer to him for ministerial appointments, but also secretaries and even attendants. Âli Pasha was also known to remove those with whom he disagreed politically, such as, the Young Ottomans. The Young Ottomans disagreed vehemently with the Tanzimat reform and saw it as pandering to the demands of Europe at the expense of sharia law. Âli Pasha, on the other hand, wanted the fusion of all subjects by providing equal opportunities in education and public office, with the result being that Christians no longer would see themselves as oppressed by the Ottoman state, therefore leading to a more stable empire. This idea of fusion of Ottoman citizens was known as Ottomanism and the Young Ottomans did not share this view, expressing their views through media like newspapers. Although the opposition tactics of the Young Ottomans were within the boundaries of Constantinople censorship, Âli Pasha nonetheless closed down their newspapers and banished them.

During Abdul Aziz's 1867 European tour, Âli Pasha stayed in the capital and was appointed regent of the Ottoman Sultanate, for a 44 day period.

=== Treatment of the Baha'is ===
See Baha'u'llah's letter to Âli Pasha here.

== Death and legacy ==
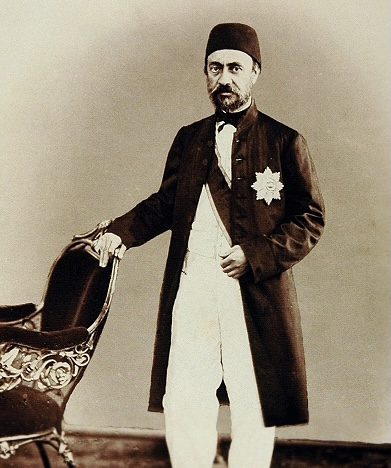
Mehmed Emin Âli Pasha, the principal architect of the Islâhat Fermânı.

His close friend and fellow Tanzimat reformer was Fuad Pasha, who died in 1869 as the acting foreign minister. Upon his death, Âli Pasha took on the roles of both foreign minister and prime minister (grand vizier). Grieving over the death of Fuad Pasha, and with the added stress of enacting reforms by himself, Âli Pasha's health began to deteriorate. He was stricken with tuberculosis and died on 7 September 1871 after three months of illness, at the age of 56.

In response to his death, the Young Ottomans returned from exile, hoping to find a government more in line with their ideals. The Tanzimat period was terminated. The new Vezir, Mahmud Nedim Pasha, was an advocate of sultanic absolutism, and the only thing he shared at all with the Young Ottomans was the belief of an Islamic character of the Ottoman Empire.

== Politics ==
Historian Roderic Davison describes Âlî as small and frail, being soft spoken, speaking barely above a whisper, but with active eyes. As well as being meticulous, he appreciated formality and hierarchy. While he was not one to make rivals, he also trained no successors, which proved to be a turning point in the empire upon his death in 1871. Âlî's politics put him as a conservative reformer, being a monarchist and an Islamic supremacist, albeit he was strongly in favor of equality under the law and İttihad-ı Anasır. Unlike Fuad, he consistently distrusted parliaments and constitutions, and has sometimes been portrayed as von Metternich's Ottoman counterpart. He was a fierce proponent of the independence of the Porte, and overtime, he developed autocratic tendencies. His place in the Ottoman government made him an anathema of the Young Ottomans.

Âlî Pasha was a freemason.

== Âlî Pasha's testament ==
In 1910, a political testament of the deceased Âli Pasha was published. The document was written in 1871, just before his death, and was addressed to Sultan Abdülaziz. In it, he recounts his accomplishments such as keeping the Ottoman Empire intact, improving the bureaucracy, dealing with revolts with minor concessions, starting railroad construction and appeasement of European powers. He also mentions some failures on his part, such as the inadequate tax system, and goes on to give the sultan advice for the future. Such advice includes maintaining religious freedom, accepting non-Muslims into the armed forces and civil service, and improving the tax system by employing controlled companies to collect taxes. However, later research has cast serious doubt on the accuracy and authenticity of the testament. Aydogdu has shown that the testament was received as a hoax when it was first published in a newspaper in 1871 after Âli Pasha's death and it was not advocated by any of the Pasha's inheritors.

== Awards ==
He was awarded the Order of the Red Eagle, 1st Class (for non-Christians) in 1851.

== See also ==
- Ali Kararname
- List of Ottoman grand viziers
- Internationalization of the Danube River
- Mehmed Rashid Pasha

== Notes ==
Preceded by Koca Mustafa Reşid Pasha	Grand Vizier; 6 August 1852 - 3 October 1852	Succeeded by Damat Mehmed Ali Pasha
Preceded by Koca Mustafa Reşid Pasha	Grand Vizier; 2 May 1855 - 1 November 1856	Succeeded by Koca Mustafa Reşid Pasha
Preceded by Koca Mustafa Reşid Pasha	Grand Vizier; 7 January 1858 - 18 October 1859	Succeeded by Kıbrıslı Mehmed Emin Pasha
Preceded by Kıbrıslı Mehmed Emin Pasha	Grand Vizier; 6 August 1861 - 22 November 1861	Succeeded by Keçecizade Mehmed Emin Fuad Pasha
Preceded by Mütercim Mehmed Rüşdi Pasha	Grand Vizier; 11 February 1867 - 7 September 1871	Succeeded by Mahmud Nedim Pasha
