= Ali Decree =

1867 Ottoman censorship decree

The Ali Decree or Ali Kararname (Turkish: Kararnâme-i Âlî) was a government decree that allowed for censorship in the Ottoman Empire. Issued in 1867, it allowed state officials to close down newspapers which they felt posed a threat to the regime. This decree was issued by Ali Pasha and later became known by his name.

It was the first serious attempt by the Ottoman government to restrict publications which published material opposing the governing elite. It did not succeed in its attempt to suppress the publication of the periodical publications; they became more numerous than ever.
