= Confiscation in the Ottoman Empire =

Confiscation in the Ottoman Empire was government seizure of the assets of citizens considered undeserving. Starting in the 17th century, assets were confiscated from high-degree servants who had died or were executed.

== History ==
The practice was abolished by Mahmud II.

Confiscation was based on a law declaring that property acquired by individuals in government service belonged to the public. Supported by Sultan Mehmed II, the law sought to keep public servants from accumulating assets and to ensure they carried out their government service appropriately. Later, rural land governors confiscated assets from affluent locals in order to offer gifts to the Sultan and the Grand Vizier. One of Mahmut II's reforms was a ban on confiscation except with the court's permission.

In 1839, confiscation in the Ottoman Empire was abolished by the Edict of Gülhane.

== See also ==
- Confiscation of Armenian properties in Turkey § Confiscation as part of the Armenian genocide
