= Imperial Council (Ottoman Empire) =

De facto cabinet of the Ottoman Empire

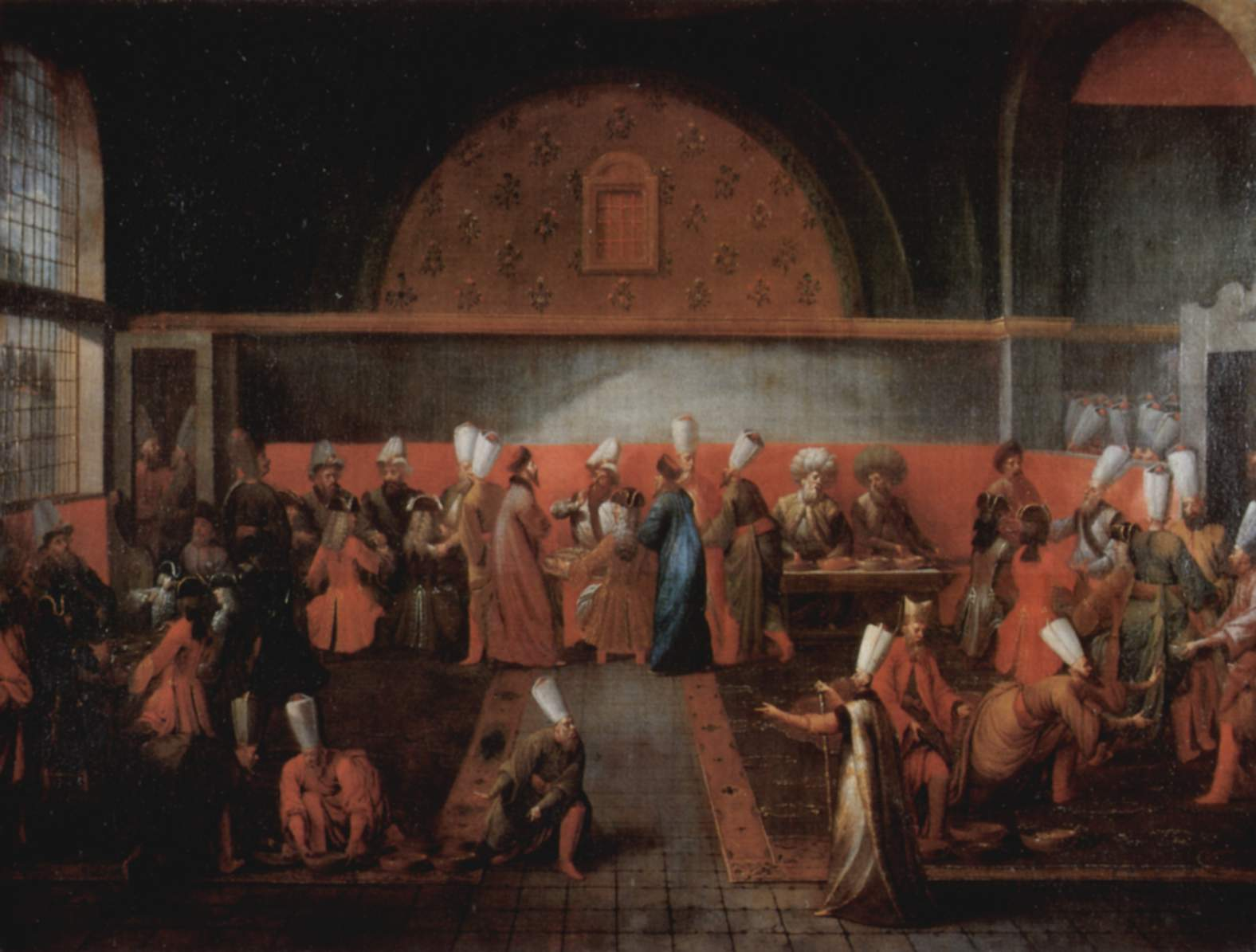
Reception of the French ambassador by the Grand Vizier and the Imperial Council in 1724

The Imperial Council or Imperial Divan (Ottoman Turkish: ديوان همايون, romanized: Dîvân-ı Hümâyûn), was the de facto cabinet of the Ottoman Empire for most of its history. Initially an informal gathering of the senior ministers presided over by the Sultan in person, in the mid-15th century the Council's composition and function became firmly regulated. The Grand vizier, who became the Sultan's deputy as the head of government, assumed the role of chairing the Council, which comprised also the other viziers, charged with military and political affairs, the two kadi'askers or military judges, the defterdars in charge of finances, the nişancı in charge of the palace scribal service, and later the Kapudan Pasha, the head of the Ottoman Navy, and occasionally the beylerbey of Rumelia and the Agha of the Janissaries. The Council met in a dedicated building in the Second Courtyard of the Topkapi Palace, initially daily, then for four days a week by the 16th century. Its remit encompassed all matters of governance of the Empire, although the exact proceedings are no longer known. It was assisted by an extensive secretarial bureaucracy under the reis ül-küttab for the drafting of appropriate documents and the keeping of records. The Imperial Council remained the main executive organ of the Ottoman state until the mid-17th century, after which it lost most of its power to the office of the Grand Vizier. With the Tanzimat reforms of the 19th century, it was eventually succeeded by a Western-style cabinet government, the Council of Ministers.

== History and function ==
Originally, the Imperial Council was probably an informal advisory body of senior statesmen, but also functioned as a court of law. In the 14th century and until the mid-15th century, it seems to have been headed by the Sultan in person, "suggesting that relations between sultan and viziers were still informal, with the sultan’s advisors in the role of allies as much as subordinates" according to the Ottomanist Colin Imber. Meetings were often public or semi-public affairs in which the Sultan would appear surrounded by his senior advisors and hear grievances of his subjects, dispense justice and make appointments to public office. In the case of an interregnum between the death of a Sultan and the arrival of his successor from the provinces, the Council was held by the senior councillors on their own.

Later Ottoman tradition held that it was Mehmed II (r. 1444–1446, 1451–1481) who abandoned the practice of presiding over the council in person, instead delegating this responsibility to the Grand Vizier, ipso facto defining the latter as a distinct office from the other viziers. Mehmed II's law-code states that the Sultan would observe Council sessions behind a screen, a practice which lasted until the reign of Süleyman the Magnificent (r. 1520–1566), who ceased to attend Council meetings altogether. Nevertheless Mehmed II's successor, Bayezid II (r. 1481–1512) is still recorded as openly chairing sessions of the Council in person, although by this time, these occasions were involved in elaborate ceremonial, in stark contrast to the informality of such audiences before Mehmed II.

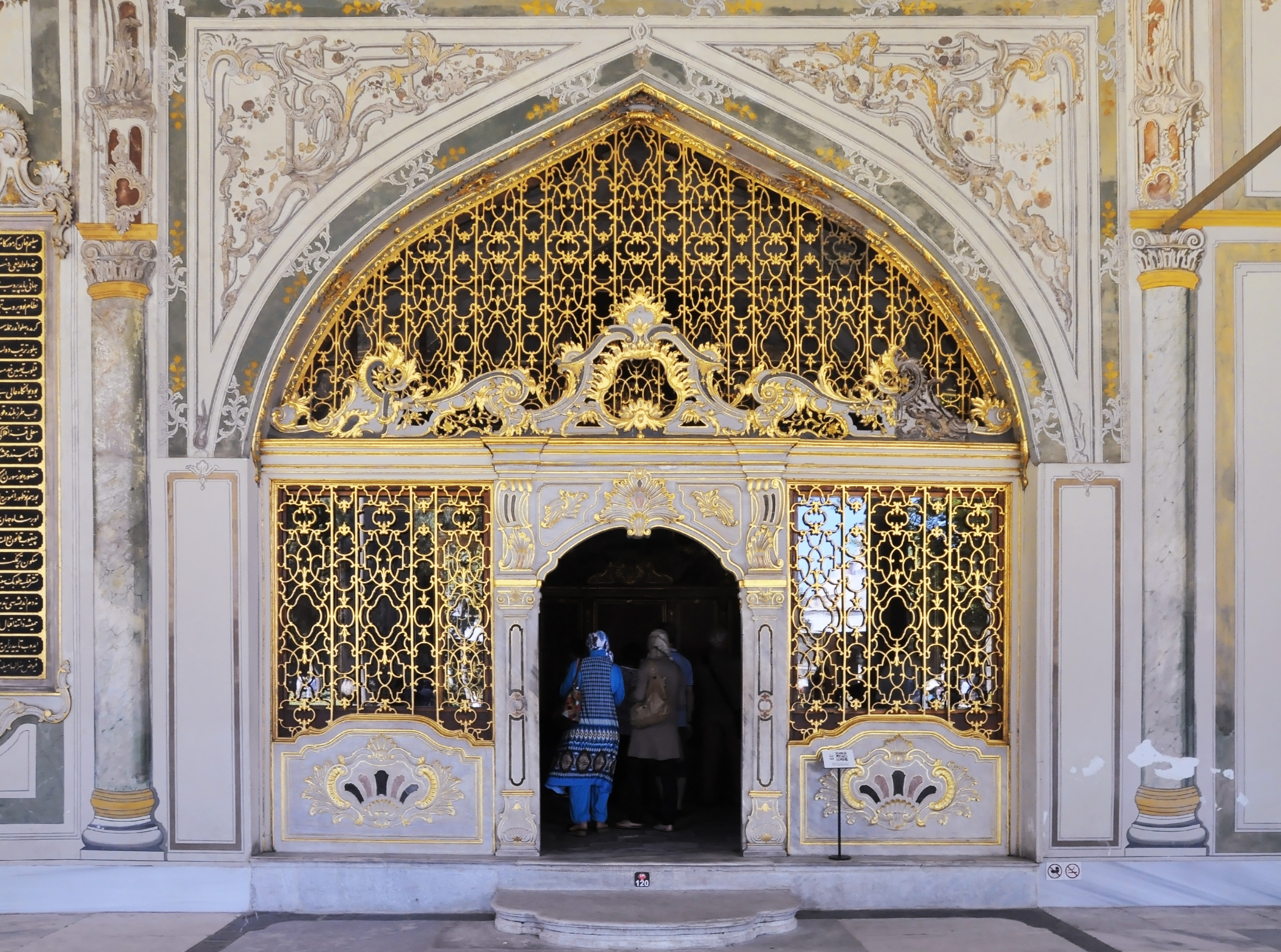
The gate of the Imperial Council chamber at the Topkapi Palace, Istanbul

After Edirne became the Ottoman capital in the late 14th century, the Council met at the palace there or anywhere the Sultan currently resided. Following the Fall of Constantinople in 1453, the Council met initially at the Eski Saray (Old Palace), moving to the Topkapi Palace after its construction in the 1470s. There the Council had a dedicated building (divanhane) in the Second Courtyard. The present building was built in the early reign of Süleyman the Magnificent by Grand Vizier Pargalı Ibrahim Pasha, and renovated in 1792 and 1819. The council chamber proper was known as kubbealtı ("under the dome"). During campaigns, the Council met at the Grand Vizier's tent, which was always pitched near the Sultan's own.

The law-code of Mehmed II stipulates that the Council had to meet daily, of which four times in the Council Chamber (Arz Odası) in the Topkapi Palace, where they were received by the chief usher (çavuş başı) and the intendant of the doorkeepers (kapıcılar kethudası). By the 16th century, however, the full Council met regularly on four days of the week, on Saturdays, Sundays, Mondays and Tuesdays, and sessions lasted from seven to eight hours, beginning at dawn and ending at mid-day in summer and mid-afternoon in winter. The members ate three times during each council session, breakfasting after their arrival, then after the main discussion had been concluded and finally after hearing petitions. In earlier times, the Sultan often dined with the viziers after the Council, but Mehmed II ended this practice. In addition, there were extraordinary sessions of the Council: the ulufe divani or galebe divani, convened each quarter to distribute the quarterly salary (ulue) to the members of the kapıkulu ("slaves of the Porte") corps, including the Janissaries, as well as for the formal reception of foreign ambassadors, and the ayak divani or "foot council", as everyone remained standing, an emergency session chaired by the Sultan or the army commander when on campaign.

Although many decisions were taken outside the formal context of the Imperial Council, it was the main executive body of the Empire, conducting all kinds of tasks of government such as the conduct of foreign relations, including the reception of foreign ambassadors, the preparation of campaigns, the construction of fortifications and public buildings, the reception of reports from the provincial governors and the appointments to state office, as well as continuing to function as a court of law, particularly for members of the military class. The inner workings of the Council are obscure, since no minutes were kept during the sessions, but the wording of Council decrees indicates that most decisions were prompted by petitions addressing a specific problem. Later foreign observers reporting on Ottoman affairs also stressed that the council was "purely consultative, the final responsibility resting with the Grand Vizier" (Bernard Lewis).

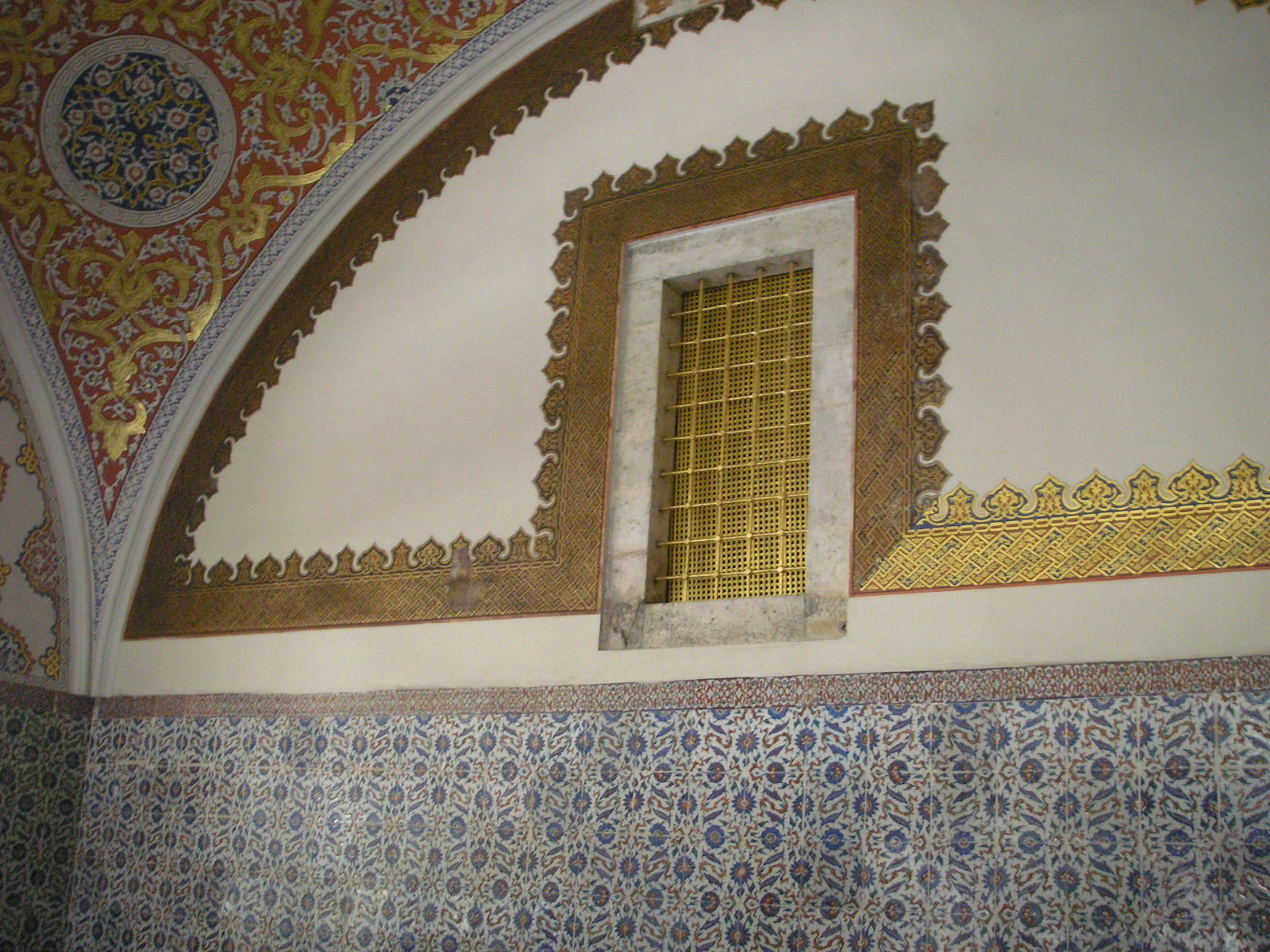
The grille-covered window from which the Sultan or Valide Sultan could observe Council meetings and issue orders on some controversial or critical issues

It is impossible to determine what role the Sultan played in the Council's workings. On the one hand, all decisions were made in his name and on his authority, and Ottoman law codes foresaw that the Sultan could make his wishes known to the Council through the Kapi Agha. In Ottoman legal theory, however, as codified in the 16th and 17th centuries, the Grand Vizier was the Sultan's "absolute deputy" and the sole intermediary between the sovereign and the administration. Therefore after each meeting, the Grand Vizier—according to some 16th-century accounts, however, this was done by the entire Council—would go to report on proceedings to the Sultan in the Inner Palace. These interviews between the Grand Vizier and the Sultan were probably the main conduit of communication between the ruler and his government. At the same time, the Sultan could, if he wished, secretly listen in on the Council in session behind a grille-covered window (kasr-ı adil) overlooking the Council chamber and connected directly with the Sultan's private quarters in the harem, added either in the early reign of Süleyman the Magnificent or, according to another tradition, already by Mehmed II. It is clear, however, that each Sultan favoured a different style of government, and their roles changed even within the same reign: thus Ahmed I (r. 1603–1617) is recorded as refusing an audience with his Grand Vizier, demanding written reports instead, while Murad III (r. 1574–1595) at first once more presided over Council meetings in person, but increasingly withdrew from active participation as his reign proceeded. By the mid-17th century, on the other hand, the former elaborate protocol at Council sessions had once more been relaxed, and it is reported by the Ottoman renegade Bobovi that the Sultan (possibly Murad IV, r. 1623–1640) once more presided over Council meetings in person. In addition, the courtiers and servants of the Inner Palace, or the members of the Imperial Harem such as the Valide Sultan (Sultana mother) or the Haseki Sultan (Sultana consort), who had direct and intimate access to the Sultan's person, often influenced government decisions bypassing the Imperial Council and the Grand Vizier altogether.

Over time, as the importance of the Grand Vizier within the Ottoman system rose at the expense of the palace, it became common to hold an afternoon meeting (ikindi divani) to wrap up leftover issues, after the afternoon prayer (ikindi), at the Grand Vizier's residence. Eventually, the ikindi divani came to meet five times a week and took over a large part of the Council's actual business. The Grand Vizier's pre-eminence was formalized in 1654, when a dedicated building (bab-i ali, the "Sublime Porte", or pasha kapısı) was constructed to serve the Grand Vizier both as a residence and as an office. The bureaucracy serving the Imperial Council was gradually transferred to this new location, and by the 18th century, the Imperial Council itself had, according to Bernard Lewis, "dwindled into insignificance". The reformist sultans of the late 18th/early 19th century replaced the Imperial Council by a new institution, as well as forming special councils to apply their reforms. This system gradually evolved into a Western-style cabinet government, the Council of Ministers.

== Membership ==
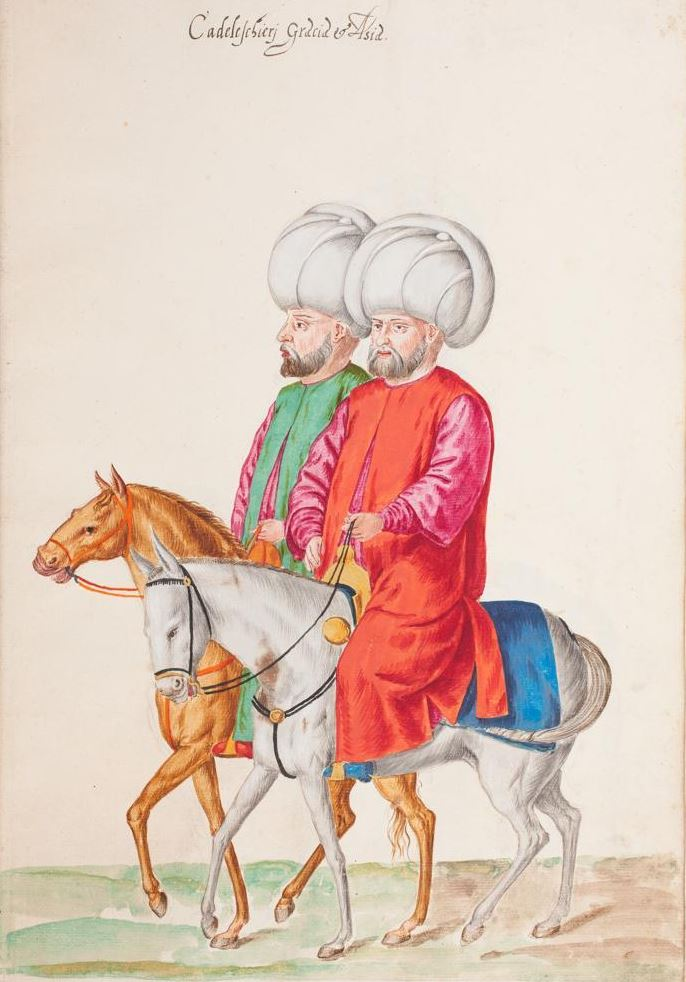
Kadi'askers from the Turkish Costume Book by Lambert de Vos, 1574

The principal members of the Council had become fixed by the time of Mehmed II at least. They comprised:

- the viziers, responsible for political and military affairs, and also liable to be sent on campaign, either under the Sultan or the Grand Vizier, or as commanders themselves. Their number was originally three, but this was raised to four in the mid-16th century, five in 1566, and seven in 1570/1. Their number reached as many as eleven in 1642, but by this time the title of vizier was also held by senior provincial governors (beylerbeys), who did not attend the council. The viziers with the right to attend the Council were designated "viziers of the dome" (kubbe vezirleri) from the dome surmounting the council chamber in the divanhane.
- the military judges (kadi'askers), responsible for legal matters. Probably founded under Murad I, there was only one holder of the post until the late reign of Mehmed II, when a second was instituted, leading to a division of responsibility between them: one was responsible for Rumelia (the European provinces) and one for Anatolia (the Asian provinces). For brief periods, the existence of a third kadi'asker is attested as well.
- the treasurers (defterdars), originally a single office-holder, increased to two (likewise one for Rumelia and one for Anatolia) by 1526, and four from 1578 (Rumelia, Anatolia, Istanbul and the "Danube", i.e. the northern coasts of the Black Sea). Further defterdars served in the provinces. With the decline of state finances from the late 16th century on, their importance increased greatly.
- the chancellor (nişancı), possibly one of the most ancient offices, was originally the person who drew the Sultan's seal on documents to make them official. He became the head of an ever-expanding the government secretariat, overseeing the production of official documents.

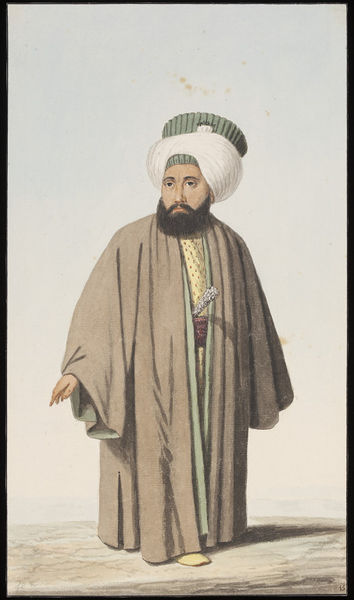
A defterdar

The members of the Imperial Council represented the pinnacles of their respective specialized careers: the viziers the military-political; the kadi'askers the legal; the defterdars the financial service; and the nişancı the palace scribal service. This was all the more the case after the 16th century, when these careers became—as a general rule—mutually exclusive. While the latter groups were from the outset recruited mostly from the Muslim Turkish population (although the kadi'askers tended to come from a very limited circle of legal families), the viziers were, after 1453, mostly drawn from Christian converts. These were partly voluntary (including, until the early 16th century, members of Byzantine and other Balkan aristocratic families) but over time the products of the devshirme system, which inducted humble-born youths into the Palace School, came to predominate. An appointment to the ranks of the Imperial Council was an avenue to great power, influence and enormous wealth, which was matched by equally ostentatious expenditure for, as Colin Imber writes, "the sign of a man's status in Ottoman society was the size of his household and the size of his retinue when he appeared in public", meaning that the members of the Council often kept hundreds, if not thousands, of slaves.

Over time, the Council's membership was extended to include additional officials:

- the beylerbey of the Rumelia Eyalet, who was the only provincial governor entitled to a seat in the Council, but only when a matter fell within his jurisdiction.
- after the post's creation in 1535, the Kapudan Pasha, the commander-in-chief of the Ottoman navy, was also admitted as a member.
- the Agha of the Janissaries was admitted to the Council if he held the rank of vizier.

In addition, a number of officials attended Council meetings but did not have seats in the chamber and did not take part in the discussions, such as the head of the scribes (reis ül-küttab), the çavuş başı, the kapıcılar kethudası, various financial secretaries and palace officials, interpreters (tercüman, whence "dragoman") and police chiefs, each in turn with his own retinue of clerks and assistants.

== Council bureaucracy ==
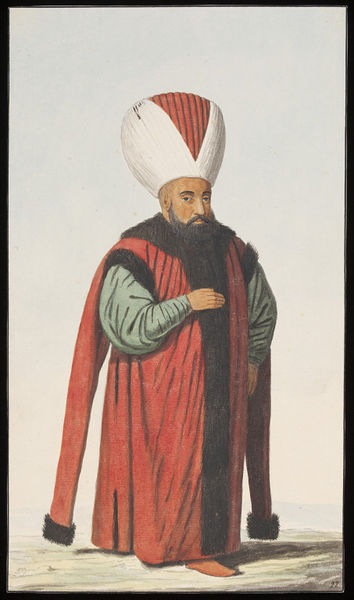
The reis ül-küttab

An ever-expanding scribal service, under the supervision of the reis ül-küttab, assisted the members of the Council, preparing the material for its sessions, keeping records of its decisions and creating the necessary documents. As their duties included drafting the state correspondence with other powers, initially they were probably drawn from various milieus, since until the early 16th century the Sultans corresponded with foreign rulers in their own language. After c. 1520 documents were only drawn up in Turkish, Arabic or Persian, and the service seems to have consisted solely of Muslims.

The main branches of this secretarial service were:

- the main chancery (divan kalemi or beylik/beylikçi kalemi) under the beylikçi, the senior subordinate of the reis ül-küttab. This was the office responsible for drafting and publishing all imperial decrees (firman) or ordinances on all issues except for financial ones, and for keeping an archive of the originals of all laws and regulations (kanun) as well as treaties or other documents concerning relations with other states.
- the tahvil kalemi, also nişan or kese kalemi, which issued the documents of appointment for the posts of vizier, beylerbey, sanjakbey and provincial kadi, and kept the relevant records. In addition, it dealt with the grant and transfer of timars and ziamets.
- the ruus kalemi, which was responsible for the appointments of all other civil, military or religious officials beyond those dealt with by the tahvil kalemi.
- the offices of the master of ceremonies (tesrifatçı) and official court chronicler (vakanüvis) who kept records on ceremonies and history.
- a later addition, the amedi or amedci, the chief of staff to the reis ül-küttab, headed a department responsible for the conduct of foreign affairs, as well as for the liaison between the various government departments and the palace.

== See also ==
- Privy council

== Sources ==
- Imber, Colin (2002). The Ottoman Empire, 1300–1650: The Structure of Power (First ed.). Basingstoke: Palgrave Macmillan. ISBN 978-0-3336-1386-3.
- Lewis, Bernard (1965). "Dīwān-ī Humāyūn". In Lewis, B.; Pellat, Ch. & Schacht, J. (eds.). The Encyclopaedia of Islam, Second Edition. Volume II: C–G. Leiden: E. J. Brill. pp. 337–339. OCLC 495469475.
