= Roderic H. Davison =

American historian

Roderic H. Davison (April 27, 1917 – March 23, 1996) was an American historian of the Middle East who taught at George Washington University from 1947 to 1993. He served as president of the Middle East Studies Association and the Turkish Studies Association, and as treasurer of the American Historical Association.

== Life ==
Born in Buffalo, New York, the son of an academic at Robert College, Davison grew up in Istanbul. He graduated from Princeton University in 1937 and gained a masters and PhD in history from Harvard University. In 1947 he began teaching courses at George Washington University, on Near Eastern and European diplomatic history and on the Ottoman Empire for over 40 years. Becoming a professor in 1954, he retired in 1993. Davison was an Armenian genocide denier.

Davison died of respiratory illness on March 23, 1996, at Sibley Memorial Hospital.

== Books ==
- Reform in the Ottoman Empire 1856–1876, Gordian Press (June 1973), ISBN 978-0-87752-135-8
- Essays in Ottoman and Turkish History, 1774–1923, Saqi Books (2001), ISBN 978-0-86356-324-9
- Turkey: A Short History, The Eothen Press (1998), ISBN 978-0-906719-22-0
- Roderic H. Davison (1948). "The Armenian Crisis, 1912–1914". The American Historical Review. Vol. 53, No. 3. Vol. 53. NY: Oxford University Press. pp. 481–505. doi:10.2307/1840566. JSTOR 1840566.
