= Ibrahim Sarim Pasha =

Grand Vizier of the Ottoman Empire (1848)

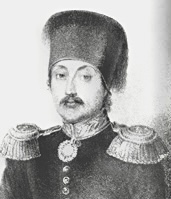
İbrahim Sarim Pasha

İbrahim Sarim Pasha (1801–1853) was an Ottoman statesman. He was Grand Vizier of the Ottoman Empire from 29 April 1848 until 12 August 1848. In 1838, he received the titles of embassy and deputy foreign minister and was sent to England and represented the Ottoman Empire at the coronation ceremony of Queen Victoria.
