= Council of Ministers (Ottoman Empire) =

Ottoman Cabinet in the Tanzimat Period

The Council of Ministers (Ottoman Turkish: Meclis-i Vükela or Heyet-i Vükela) was a cabinet created during the Tanzimat period in the Ottoman Empire by Sultan Mahmud II in what was the Empire's first step towards European modernization. It was formed to coordinate the executive activities of the ministry and form the policy of the Ottoman power structure, as well as approve or disapprove legislative proposals before being presented to the Sultan.

== Membership ==
With its members appointed by the Sultan, the Meclis-i Vükela's duties were an extension of his executive power and agenda, however they often added their opinions to proposals before passing them along to the Sultan. Culminating the executive organs of government on a central level, it was the principal executive and legislative coordinating body of the Ottoman plutocracy. The exact composition of the Council of Ministers varied, but it usually consisted of leading ministers of the Ottoman state, the Shaykh al-Islām, the Serasker and the Grand Admiral, or more often their undersecretaries: the directors of the police and arsenal of Istanbul, the undersecretary of the Grand Vizier, the heads of the department of excise taxes (Rusumat Emini) and the lieutenant (Kethüda) of the queen mother, who represented the Sultan's palace.

Because members were appointed by and responsible to the sultan for their departments, they were relatively independent of the Grand Vizier, although he often chaired the Meclis-i Vükela cabinet. The lack of central leadership within the Meclis-i Vükela frequently allowed for individual and party politics to predominate in its work, often making it difficult to conduct business. The Meclis-i Vükela however performed a number of important ceremonial, legal and political functions. After 1850, it was the Council that swore fealty to new Sultans in the official ceremony of enthronement, followed by the more general oath taken by all ruling class members of Ottoman society that where present during the ceremony.

Despite its dysfunction, innate to any bureaucratic body, the Meclis-i Vükela's role in the Ottoman government was of substantial importance. The Meclis-i Vükela acted as the closest governmental body of advisement to the Grand Vizier and Sultan on important issues as well as legislative proposals. The Meclis-i Vükela approved state budgets and parts of the legislative process and had the power to initiate state legislation.

Decisions made by the Meclis-i Vükela were communicated in the form of discussion protocols (muzakat zabut varakas) and were presented for each matter brought before the Sultan. These formal protocols contained summaries of the issues, arguments pro and con and the council's final opinion. Additionally, when legislative matters were involved these written protocols were accompanied by separate statements called mazabatas, which contained the final versions of the laws as well as regulatory concerns and the principal arguments. The Meclis-i Vükela could and often did propose changes to laws received from adjacent legislative councils. However, the Sultan made the final decisions of these proposed laws with recognition to the advisement of the Meclis-i Vükela. As modernization forced changes within the socio-political structure of the Ottoman Empire, its government cabinets followed, often being dissolved and reintroduced only years later. In 1866, Sultan Abdülaziz, son of Mahmud II, the Sultan who created the Meclis-i Vükela, changed the political role of the Council of Ministers. Sultan Abdülaziz consolidated his personal Privy Council along with Meclis-i Vükela into his own personal advisory cabinet known as the Yaveran-I Ekrem.

== Roles ==
The process of approvals for proposed legislation by the Meclis-i Vükela, was joined by the Meclis-IHass-I Umumi. The Meclis-IHass-I Umumi or the Supreme Council was composed of senior officials of the Ottoman Empire and was created as an equal yet separate body to the Meclis-i Vükela. However, after dysfunction and inefficiency within the Supreme Council and its identical purpose to the Council of Tanzimat, the two government bodies were consolidated and divided into three separate departments.

1. The Department of Laws and Regulation, which assumed the legislative functions of both old councils.
2. The Department of Administration and Finance, which was charged with administrative investigations.
3. The Department of Judicial Cases, which assumed the old Supreme Council function of Meclis-I Valas. Though equal to the Meclis-i Vükela, members were chosen and approved by the Meclis-i Vükela, which represented an extension of the Sultans executive powers.

The Meclis-i Vükela also appointed members of the Supreme Council after its second reconstruction in 1867. This time however local officials and governors within the Ottoman Empire nominated candidates for appointment. Even so, in an attempt to modernize and perpetuate equal representation throughout the Empire, the governors and local officials who nominated candidates were advised by council and guilds within their own regions or state lets. Finally, the candidates up for appointment were either approved or not at the discretion of the Meclis-i Vükela.

== Formation ==
Mahmud II instituted extensive reforms, which eventually culminated into the Decree of Tanzimat (Reorganization). The forced disbandment of the Janissaries was his first achievement. Since the early 17th century, the Janissary corps had ceased being effective; any sultan who attempted to modernize the Ottoman military was dethroned. The Janissaries mutinied when Mahmud announced a new army, and advanced on his palace. However, he successfully responded; the Janissaries were suppressed, and their members killed, exiled, or imprisoned. They were replaced by the Sekban-I Cedit, which were organized and trained along modern European lines.

Mahmud's second policy change was his creation of a parliamentary style government based on the European models he felt so compelled to imitate. With rising pressure from Europe to “modernize”, and provide non-Muslim subjects of the empire with equitable rights, Mahmud centralized the power of the Ottoman government and formed an efficient bureaucracy. Also in similar fashion to the way which he suppressed the Janissary military force, Mahmud II took a comparable approach to relieving the influential ulema's from their religious and political power so that he could progress in his governmental changes. His goal was to create a secular power structure within the Empire that provided, in theory at least, equal representation of all Ottoman subjects.

These changes were not solely afforded to the government structure; they were also intended to change the minds of the Ottoman people, creating a socio-cultural shift towards a more European identity. Men were forced to don European garb and could only wear turbans in religious settings. These reforms were heavily influenced by French law as a result of Ottoman students being educated in France. Mahmud II often attended the meetings of the Meclis-i Vükela when concerning Ottoman modernization, and dressed the part. This often influenced the dress of the Meclis-i Vükela members, while giving his immediate judgements on the issues of modernization.

After his death in 1839, the Ottoman Empire entered a period of blatant reformation. With the proclamation of the Hatt-I Serfi of Gulhane and the entrance into what is called the Tanzimat period of the Ottoman history, his son and successor Abdülmecid I followed the reformation path his father set forth.

== Second Constitutional Era ==
During the First Constitutional Era of the Ottoman Empire (1876–1878), the Council submitted annual budgets to the Chamber of Deputies (the lower house of the larger parliament, the General Assembly), who would vote on them.

== See also ==
- Auspicious Incident
- Edict of Gülhane
- Tanzimat
