= Şehzade Mehmed Cemaleddin =

Ottoman prince, son of Şehzade Mehmed Şevket

- Born: 1 March 1891; Yıldız Palace, Constantinople, Ottoman Empire (now Istanbul, Turkey)
- Died: 18 November 1947 (aged 56); Beirut, Lebanon
- Spouse: Destaviz Hanım (m. 1913)
- Issue: Şehzade Mahmud Hüsameddin; Şehzade Süleyman Saadeddin
Names
- Turkish: Şehzade Mehmed Cemaleddin; Ottoman Turkish: شهزاده محمد جمال الدین
- Dynasty: Ottoman
- Father: Şehzade Mehmed Şevket
- Mother: Fatma Ruyinaz Hanım
- Religion: Sunni Islam
- Military career
- Allegiance: Ottoman Empire
- Branch: Ottoman Army
- Service years: 1915–1922 (active service)
- Rank: See list

Şehzade Mehmed Cemaleddin Efendi (Ottoman Turkish: شهزادہ محمد جمال الدین; 1 March 1891 – 18 November 1947) was an Ottoman prince, the son of Şehzade Mehmed Şevket and the grandson of Sultan Abdulaziz.

== Early life ==
Şehzade Mehmed Cemaleddin was born on 1 March 1891 in the Yıldız Palace. His father was Şehzade Mehmed Şevket, son of Sultan Abdulaziz and Neşerek Kadın, and his mother was Fatma Ruyinaz Hanım. He was the only child of his parents. His father died when he was eight. In 1899, he was circumcised together with Şehzade Abdurrahim Hayri, son of Sultan Abdul Hamid II and Şehzade Mehmed Abdülhalim, son of Şehzade Selim Süleyman.

== Military career ==
Cemaleddin worked on the Libyan Front. He carried out guerrilla activities against the British in Egypt. He saw active service during the First World War, in which he participated with the rank of major general and fought on various fronts. He first served during the Gallipoli campaign. He fought in the landing at Seddülbahir in 1915. There he fell ill and was withdrawn from service.

He was then appointed as Commander of the training camps of the 3rd Army, where he stayed for two years. After the conquest of Batumi in April 1918, which had been ceded to the Ottoman Empire under the Treaty of Brest-Litovsk in March 1918, Turkish troops entered the city the following month. Cemaleddin was sent there, where he served under Wehib Pasha. In his memoirs, Wehib Pasha mentioned the prince's conduct and abilities extremely positively.

During the Armistice period, he traveled around Rumelia and the Black Sea coast as the head of the Advisory Committee. He played a role in suppressing the Revolt of Ahmet Anzavur. Kâzım Karabekir mentions Cemaleddin in his diaries. Cemaleddin was an idealist soldier, and did not like the state of the officers. By 1918, he was serving as honorary aide-de-camp to the Sultan.

Cemaleddin, who had won the hearts of the soldiers and the people with his kindness and honest treatment, wanted to go to Anatolia, but the presence of a popular and powerful prince at the beginning of the resistance movement was not accepted by the Ankara government. However, at the end of 1919, the Ankara government thought of declaring him as the regent of the Ottoman Empire and Sheikh Sünûsî as Shaykh al-Islām. However, in the light of information received from Kâzım Karabekir, it was decided that he could not be made the regent.

== Personal life ==
His only wife was Cemile Destaviz Hanım. She was born on 13 August 1895 in Batumi, Adjara. They married on 2 March 1913 in the Ortaköy Palace. She was the mother of Şehzade Mahmud Hüsameddin, born on 1 September 1916 and Şehzade Süleyman Saadeddin, born on 20 November 1917.

== Exile and death ==
Upon the exile of the Imperial family in March 1924, Cemaleddin and his family settled in Beirut, Lebanon, where he died on 18 November 1947.

== Honours ==
Styles of Şehzade Mehmed Cemaleddin
- Reference style: His Imperial Highness
- Spoken style: Your Imperial Highness

- Order of Glory, Jeweled
- Order of Distinction, Jeweled
- Order of Osmanieh, Jeweled
- Order of the Medjidie, Jeweled
- Liakat War Medal
- Navy Medal in Gold
- Liakat War Medal in Gold
- Greek War Medal

=== Military appointments ===
==== Military ranks and army appointments ====
- c. 1915: Major General of the Infantry, Ottoman Army

==== Honorary appointments ====
- c. 1918: Aide-de-Camp to the Sultan

== Issue ==
Name	Birth	Death	Notes
Şehzade Mahmud Hüsameddin	1 September 1916	7 August 1966	Born in Ortaköy Palace; Died unmarried in Beirut, Lebanon;
Şehzade Süleyman Saadeddin	20 November 1917	8 May 1995	Born in Ortaköy Palace; Married Lamia Baba Saoui (born 1930 in Beirut, Lebanon) on 1 April 1956 in Beirut, Lebanon, and had three children, one son (Şehzade Orhan Suleiman, born on 16 July 1959, Beirut. Married Rita Eid on 2003) and two daughters (Perihan Sleiman Hanımsultan, born 2 October 1963, Beirut; and Gülhan Sleiman Hanımsultan, born 30 January 1968, Beirut); Died in Saudi Arabia;
