= Hüseyin Avni Pasha =

Grand Vizier of the Ottoman Empire from 1874 to 1875

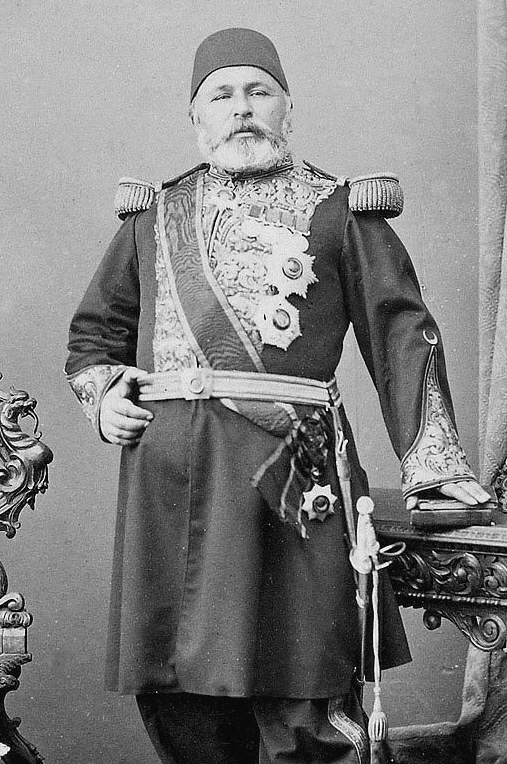

Grand Vizier of the Ottoman Empire

Personal details
- Born: 1820 Isparta, Anatolia Eyalet, Ottoman Empire
- Died: 15 June 1876 (aged 55–56) Istanbul, Ottoman Empire

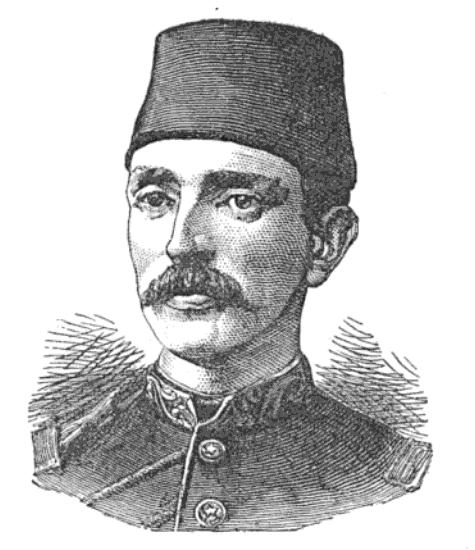
Çerkess Hasan, the murderer of Hüseyin Avni Pasha

Hüseyin Avni Pasha (Turkish: Hüseyin Avni Paşa; 1820 – 15 June 1876) was an Ottoman Turkish governor-general and statesman. He was Grand Vizier of the Ottoman Empire from 15 February 1874 to 26 April 1875. He was killed by Çerkez Hasan, the younger brother of Neşerek Kadın Efendi, who accused him of the murder of Ottoman Sultan Abdülaziz, on 15 June 1876 during a cabinet meeting of Ottoman Sultan Murad V at the residence of Midhat Pasha near Beyazıt in Fatih, Istanbul. The foreign affairs minister Mehmed Rashid Pasha was also killed by Çerkez Hasan in the attack.

== See also ==
- List of Ottoman grand viziers
