= Mehmed Reshid Pasha =

Mehmed Reshid Pasha may refer to the following Ottoman statesmen:

- Reşid Mehmed Pasha (1780–1836), grand vizier of the Ottoman Empire
- Mehmed Rashid Pasha (1825–1876), governor of Syria Vilayet and minister of foreign affairs
