= Emine Sultan =

Emine Sultan may refer to the following people:

- Emine Sultan (daughter of Mustafa II) (1696–1739), Ottoman princess
- Emine Sultan (daughter of Abdülaziz) (1874–1920), Ottoman princess
