= Şehzade Mehmed Şevket =

Ottoman prince, son of Sultan Abdulaziz

- Born: 5 June 1872; Dolmabahçe Palace, Constantinople, Ottoman Empire (now Istanbul, Turkey)
- Died: 22 October 1899 (aged 27); Ortaköy Palace, Istanbul, Ottoman Empire
- Burial: Sultan Mahmud II Mausoleum, Divanyolu, Istanbul
- Spouse: Fatma Ruyinaz Hanım (m. 1890)
- Issue: Şehzade Mehmed Cemaleddin
Names
- Turkish: Şehzade Mehmed Şevket; Ottoman Turkish: شهزاده محمد شوکت
- Dynasty: Ottoman
- Father: Abdulaziz
- Mother: Neşerek Kadın
- Religion: Sunni Islam
- Military career
- Allegiance: Ottoman Empire
- Branch: Ottoman Navy
- Service years: 1875–1899 (active service)
- Rank: See list

Şehzade Mehmed Şevket Efendi (Ottoman Turkish: شهزاده محمد شوكت; 5 June 1872 – 22 October 1899) was an Ottoman prince, the son of Sultan Abdulaziz and Neşerek Kadın.

== Early life ==
Şehzade Mehmed Şevket was born on 5 June 1872 in the Dolmabahçe Palace. His father was Abdulaziz, son of Mahmud II and Pertevniyal Sultan, and his mother was Neşerek Kadın, daughter of Prince Ismail Zevş-Barakay. He had a sister Emine Sultan, two years younger than him.

Abdulaziz was deposed on 30 May 1876 and was succeeded by his nephew Murad V. On 4 June 1876, Abdulaziz died under mysterious circumstances. His mother died a few days later, on 11 June 1876. Şevket was only four years old that time. Abdul Hamid II took care of Şevket and raised him with his sons.

Şevket began his education at Ihlamur Pavilion, in 1879, along with his sister Esma Sultan and brother Şehzade Mehmed Seyfeddin and Sultan Abdul Hamid's children Şehzade Mehmed Selim and Zekiye Sultan.

His circumcision took place on 17 December 1883, along with his brothers Abdulmejid II, Şehzade Mehmed Seyfeddin, Şehzade Mehmed Selim eldest son of Sultan Abdul Hamid, Şehzade Ibrahim Tevfik, grandson of Abdulmejid I, and Şehzade Mehmed Ziyaeddin, eldest son of Mehmed V. His circumcision was carried out by Rıfat or Saib Pasha.

== Military career ==
Mehmed Şevket was enlisted in the imperial Ottoman Navy during the reign of his father. He was given the rank of lieutenant on 27 May 1875. A year later in 1876, he was promoted to the rank of lieutenant-commander.

== Personal life ==
Şevket's only wife was Fatma Ruyinaz Hanım. She was born on 2 January 1873 in Bandırma. They married on 3 April 1890 in the Yıldız Palace, when Şevket was twenty and Ruyinaz was seventeen years old. She was the mother of the couple's only child Şehzade Mehmed Cemaleddin, born on 1 March 1891. She died 7 August 1960 in Beirut, Lebanon.

Şevket owned the Malta Pavilion located in the Yıldız Palace. He also owned a villa in Küçük Çamlıca, Üsküdar. He was a pianist by avocation.

== Death ==
Mehmed Şevket died on 22 October 1899, at the age of twenty-seven, and was buried in the mausoleum of his grandfather Mahmud II, in Divanyolu, Istanbul. Present day Sultan Abdulaziz's male generation is descended from Mehmed Şevket.

== Honours ==
Styles of Şehzade Mehmed Şevket
- Reference style: His Imperial Highness
- Spoken style: Your Imperial Highness

=== Military appointments ===
Military ranks and naval appointments

- 27 May 1875: Lieutenant, Ottoman Navy
- 1876: Lieutenant-Commander, Ottoman Navy

== Issue ==
Name	Birth	Death	Notes
Şehzade Mehmed Cemaleddin	1 March 1891	18 November 1947	born in Yıldız Palace; married once, and had issue, two sons; died in exile in Beirut, Lebanon, and buried there

== Sources ==
- Bey, Mehmet Sürreya (1969). Osmanlı devletinde kim kimdi, Volume 1. Küğ Yayını.
- Korkmaz, Mehmet (2019-12-30). "Denizin Saraylıları: Bahriye'de Osmanlı Şehzadeleri". Hazine-i Evrak Arşiv ve Tarih Araştırmaları Dergisi (in Turkish). 1 (1): 42–65.
- Uçan, Lâle (2019). Son Halife Abdülmecid Efendi'nin Hayatı - Şehzâlik, Veliahtlık ve Halifelik Yılları (PDF) (PhD Thesis). Istanbul University Institute of Social Sciences.
- Uluçay, Mustafa Çağatay (2011). Padişahların kadınları ve kızları. Ankara: Ötüken. ISBN 978-9-754-37840-5.
