= Çerkez Hasan =

Ottoman military officer

Çerkes Hasan
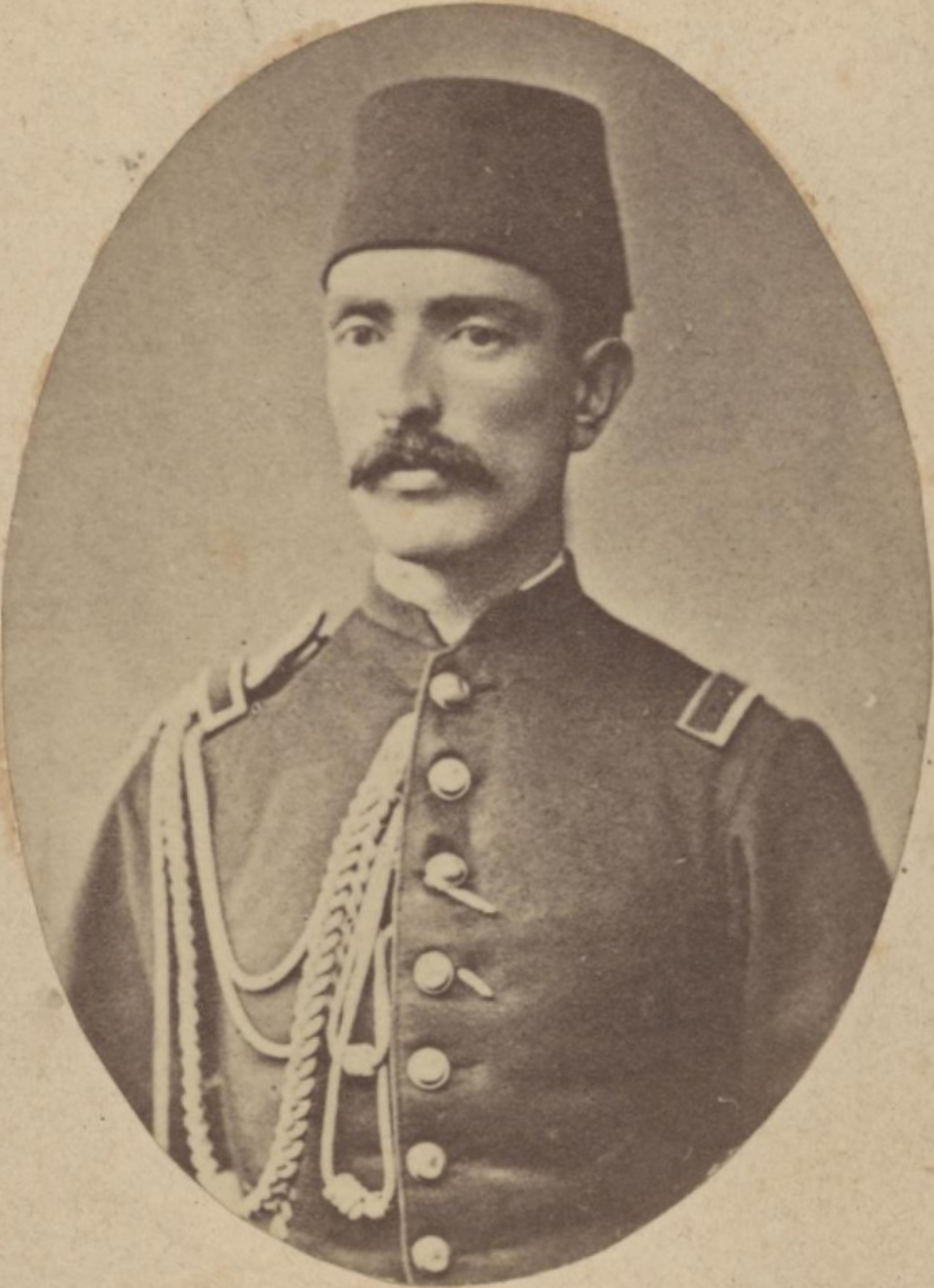
- Portrait of Çerkes Hasan, taken by Abdullah Frères
- Born: 1850
- Died: 17 June 1876 (aged 25–26)
- Known for: Assassination of Ottoman statesmen
- Relatives: Sultan Abdulaziz; Neşerek Kadın

Çerkes Hasan Bey, or Hasan the Circassian (1850 – 17 June 1876) was an Ottoman military officer and the brother-in-law of Sultan Abdulaziz. His sister, Neşerek Kadin, was one of Abdulaziz's consorts. He is known for the assassination of some Ottoman ministers during a meeting at Midhat Pasha's mansion whom he considered as the main organizers of his brother-in-law's dethronement, known as Çerkes Hasan Incident. Hasan was captured shortly afterwards, and executed after a trial.

== Early life ==
Çerkes Hasan was born into a Circassian family in 1850. His family migrated from Circassia to Constantinople in 1864. Hasan took his first education at the Ottoman Naval Academy and later attended the Ottoman Military Academy. Although he was assigned to the Ottoman Sixth army after graduating from Military Academy, he decided to work in the Ottoman Military Council. He later succeeded to be the adjutant of Yusuf Izzeddin Efendi, the eldest son of Sultan Abdulaziz. Under his command, a Greek-flagged Arkadi loaded with arms and supplies was captured when it was about to land to unload its cargo near the coast of Lakvince on 20 August 1867.

== Assassination of Ottoman ministers ==
=== Background ===
Ottoman Sultan Abdülaziz was dethroned on 30 May 1876 in a coup d'état orchestrated by several constitutionalist ministers, including Midhat Pasha, Hüseyin Avni Pasha, Rushdi Pasha, and Hasan Hayrullah Efendi. He was found dead with his wrists cut in Feriye Palace on 4 June 1876. Although the doctors who examined his body concluded that it was suicide, his relatives suspected it was murder carried out by those who had planned his dethronement. Following his deposition, Abdülaziz' nephew Murad V ascended to the throne.

Deeply affected by her husband's death, Neşerek Kadın died just one week later. These events led to intense hatred among Abdülaziz's relatives toward the ministers who had plotted against him. One of these relatives was Çerkes Hasan, Abdülaziz's brother-in-law, Neşerek's brother, and a prominent military officer during his reign. Hasan was ordered to join the Sixth Army in Baghdad by Avni Pasha who apprehended a possible revenge attack, soon after the events. Hasan, however, replied that he would remain in Istanbul for one more day. During this time, he plotted his revenge.

=== Events ===
On 15 June 1876, Çerkes Hasan raided a meeting of constitutionalist ministers at Midhat Pasha's mansion in Beyazıt where thirteen people including Grand Vizier Midhat Pasha, Hüseyin Avni Pasha, Foreign Minister Rashid Pasha, Minister of the Navy Ahmed Pasha, and Rushdi Pasha were all present. Hasan was armed with two revolvers and one dagger. Holding a revolver in his right hand and a dagger in his left, he first shot Hüseyin Avni in the abdomen. When Ahmed Pasha attempted to restrain him, Hasan slit his throat. He also killed Rashid Pasha. Ahmed Pasha was injured, while the other two ministers were killed immediately. A soldier was killed during the exchange of fire. Hasan also killed Şükrü Bey, a Naval Captain who had insulted him after his capture.

== Later life and legacy ==
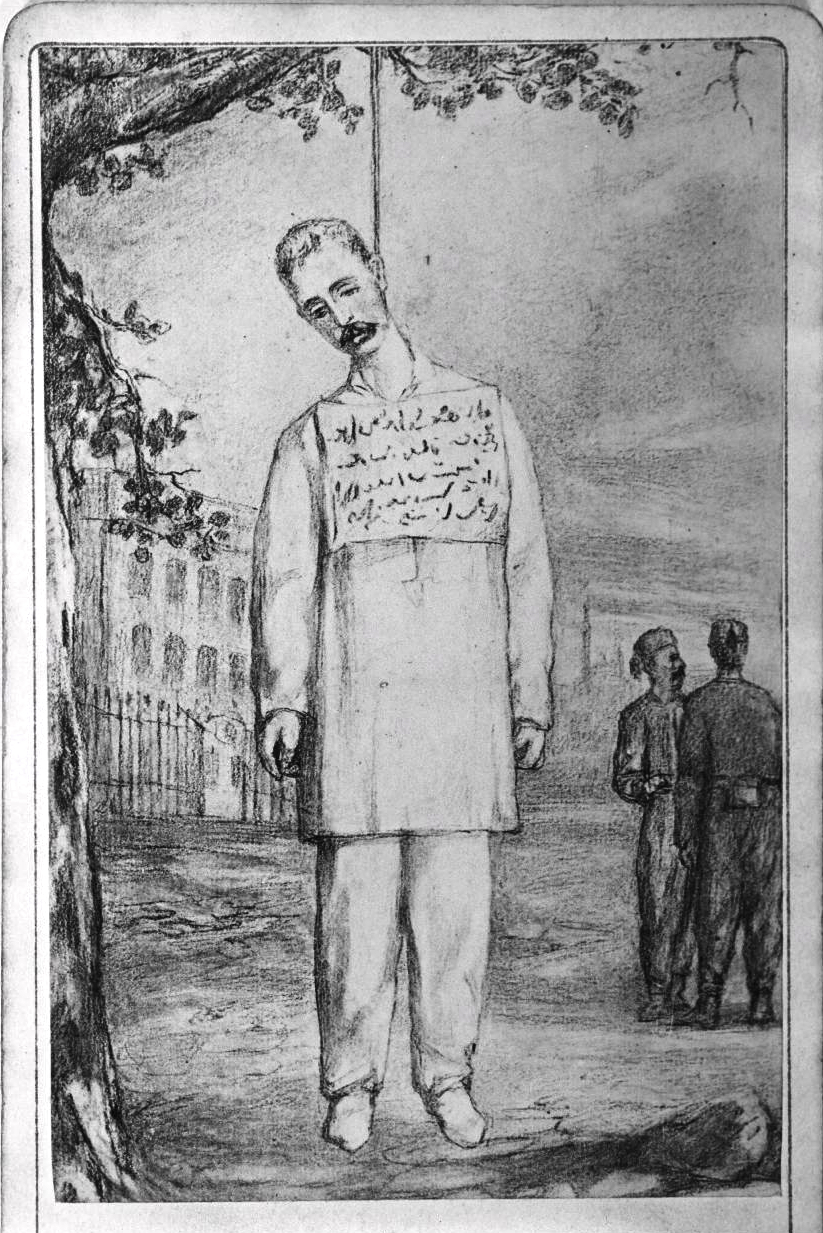
Execution of Çerkes Hasan

Hasan was captured soon afterward. He refused any medical aid for his head injuries, stating that:

“I will either be hanged or killed by bullets, there is no need for medical aid”.

He was hanged from a mulberry tree in front of the Serasker Gate in Beyazıt Square on 17 June 1876. After the event, Ottoman officials began carrying revolvers or having their servants do so as a precaution against possible assassination attempts. Additionally, people who had openly supported the coup d'état tended to hide their opinions on the matter.

An English newspaper published a news story about the incident

The Incident found wide coverage in foreign press. The U.S. Ambassador Horace Maynard sent a report about the incident to the State Department. During Sultan Abdülhamid II's rule, five years after Abdulaziz's death, the special Yıldız Court was convened and officially recognized the former sultan's death as an act of murder rather than suicide.

== Sources ==
- Brookes, Douglas Scott (November 2008). The Concubine, the Princess, and the Teacher. University of Texas Press. ISBN 9780292718425.
- Uzunçarşılı, İ. Hakkı (1945). "Çerkes Hasan Vak'ası". Belleten. 9 (33): 89–134.
- Karakoç, Ercan (2021). "The Reign of Sultan Abdulaziz in the American Press". Gazi Akademik Bakış. 14 (28): 199–224. doi:10.19060/gav.948942.
- Dal, Dilara (2016). The modernization of the Ottoman Navy during the reign of Sultan Abdülaziz (1861–1876) (PhD dissertation). University of Birmingham.
- Gündüz, Hande (2016). "Darbeler karşısında Çerkez Hasan ve Ömer Halisdemir" (PDF). Necmettin Erbakan Üniversitesi Sosyal Bilimler Dergisi – Darbeler Tarihi Özel Sayısı. 2 (2): 91–116.
