= Emine Sultan (daughter of Abdulaziz) =

Ottoman princess, daughter of Sultan Abdülaziz

- Born: 24 August 1874; Dolmabahçe Palace, Constantinople, Ottoman Empire
- Died: 30 January 1920 (aged 45); Constantinople, Ottoman Empire
- Burial: Mahmud II Mausoleum, Divanyolu, Istanbul
- Spouse: Mehmed Şerif Pasha (m. 1901; died 1920)
- Issue: Hamide Hanımsultan
- Dynasty: Ottoman
- Father: Abdulaziz
- Mother: Neşerek Kadın
- Religion: Sunni Islam

Emine Sultan (Ottoman Turkish: امینه سلطان; 24 August 1874 – 30 January 1920) was an Ottoman princess, the daughter of Ottoman Sultan Abdulaziz and Neşerek Kadın.

== Early life ==
Emine Sultan was born on 24 August 1874 at the Dolmabahçe Palace. Her father was Sultan Abdulaziz, son of Sultan Mahmud II and Pertevniyal Sultan, and her mother was Neşerek Kadın, the daughter of Prince Gazi Ismail Bey Zevş-Barakay. She was the second child of her mother and was named after her half-sister from one of her father's other consorts, who died in infancy. She was the younger full sister of Şehzade Mehmed Şevket.

Her father Abdulaziz was deposed by his ministers on 30 May 1876, when his nephew Murad V became the Sultan. The deposed sultan was transferred to the Feriye Palace the next day. The women of Abdulaziz's entourage didn't want to leave the Dolmabahçe Palace. So they were grabbed by hand and were sent out to the Feriye Palace. In the process, they were searched from head to toe and everything of value was taken from them. On 4 June 1876, Abdulaziz died under mysterious circumstances.

Her mother died a few days later, on 11 June 1876. She had become seriously ill the night of the deposition, when she was dragged under the storm naked with only a shawl on, because she had tried to hide the jewels under her clothes. Plus, she was heartbroken over Abdulaziz's death, and she was sure he had been killed. When Emine Sultan was not yet two years old, her older brother the Crown Prince Şehzade Yusuf Izzeddin raised her in his household.

== Marriage ==
Sultan Abdul Hamid II decided that his son Şehzade Mehmed Abdülkadir would marry Emine Sultan. However she disliked this decision and rejected it as she didn't want to form a marriage with someone younger than her, although the Sultan considered this pertinent. In any case, the marriage did not take place.

In 1901, Abdul Hamid arranged her trousseaux and marriage together with two of Sultan Murad V daughters, Princesses Hatice Sultan and Fehime Sultan, as well as his own daughter, Naile Sultan. At the age of twenty seven, she married Mehmed Şerif Pasha on 12 September 1901 in the Yıldız Palace. He was the son of Ahmed Şükrü Pasha. Mehmed Şerif Pasha was a scholar familiar with oriental history and literature, and was known for his translations. The couple were given the palace of Mehmed Sadık Pasha located in Çarşıkapı. The marriage was very happy and they had a daughter, Hamide Hanımsultan.

Following the 31 March incident, when Abdul Hamid was deposed and exiled to Thessaloniki, she and her husband followed him to Thessaloniki and settled in a mansion there. In 1912, they returned back along with Abdul Hamid to Istanbul during the outbreak of the First Balkan War.

In January 1910, Emine and her husband assisted Kemal Bey, alias Ahmed Fehmi Bey, in organising the Radical Ottoman Party in Istanbul. Branches of this organisation were established in Bursa and some other Anatolian towns. Soon after the extension of their activities within the empire, the government had become fully aware of the movements of the plotters, and started gathering intelligence as to their contacts in the empire.

== Death ==
Emine Sultan died on 30 January 1920 in Istanbul, after a short illness. She was forty five and was buried in the mausoleum of Sultan Mahmud II, Divanyolu, Istanbul.

Her husband was grief-stricken and devastated and composed a marsiya (an elegiac poem) in her honour, Gülşen-i adn-i perıah etdi Emine Sultan. Her death was widely mourned by her loved ones.

== Personality ==
According to Leyla Achba, Emine was a sensitive and knowledgeable woman. According to Leyla, Emine was of medium heights, fair-skinned with black eyes, arched eyebrows, dark blond hair and had a delicate figure. She would always dress in extraordinary and always wear a ruby and diamond necklace. She also hosted poets and authors in her mansion. Moreover, she was also philanthropic and she aided the orphaned and poor children. She covered their education and school expenses from her own money.

== Issue ==
By her marriage, Emine Sultan had a daughter:

- Hamide Hanımsultan. Since she does not appear to have married, she probably died a child.

== Honours ==
Styles of Emine Sultan
- Reference style: Her Imperial Highness
- Spoken style: Your Imperial Highness

- Order of the House of Osman
- Order of the Medjidie, Jeweled
- Order of Charity, 1st Class

== See also ==
- List of Ottoman princesses

== Sources ==
- Brookes, Douglas Scott (2010). The Concubine, the Princess, and the Teacher: Voices from the Ottoman Harem. University of Texas Press. ISBN 978-0-292-78335-5.
- Mustafa Çağatay Uluçay (2011). Padişahların kadınları ve kızları. Ankara, Ötüken.
- Sakaoğlu, Necdet (2008). Bu mülkün kadın sultanları: Vâlide sultanlar, hâtunlar, hasekiler, kadınefendiler, sultanefendiler. Oğlak Yayıncılık. ISBN 978-9-753-29623-6.
- Uluçay, Mustafa Çağatay (2011). Padişahların kadınları ve kızları. Ankara, Ötüken.
