= Abdulaziz =

Sultan of the Ottoman Empire from 1861 to 1876

- Custodian of the Two Holy Mosques; Khan
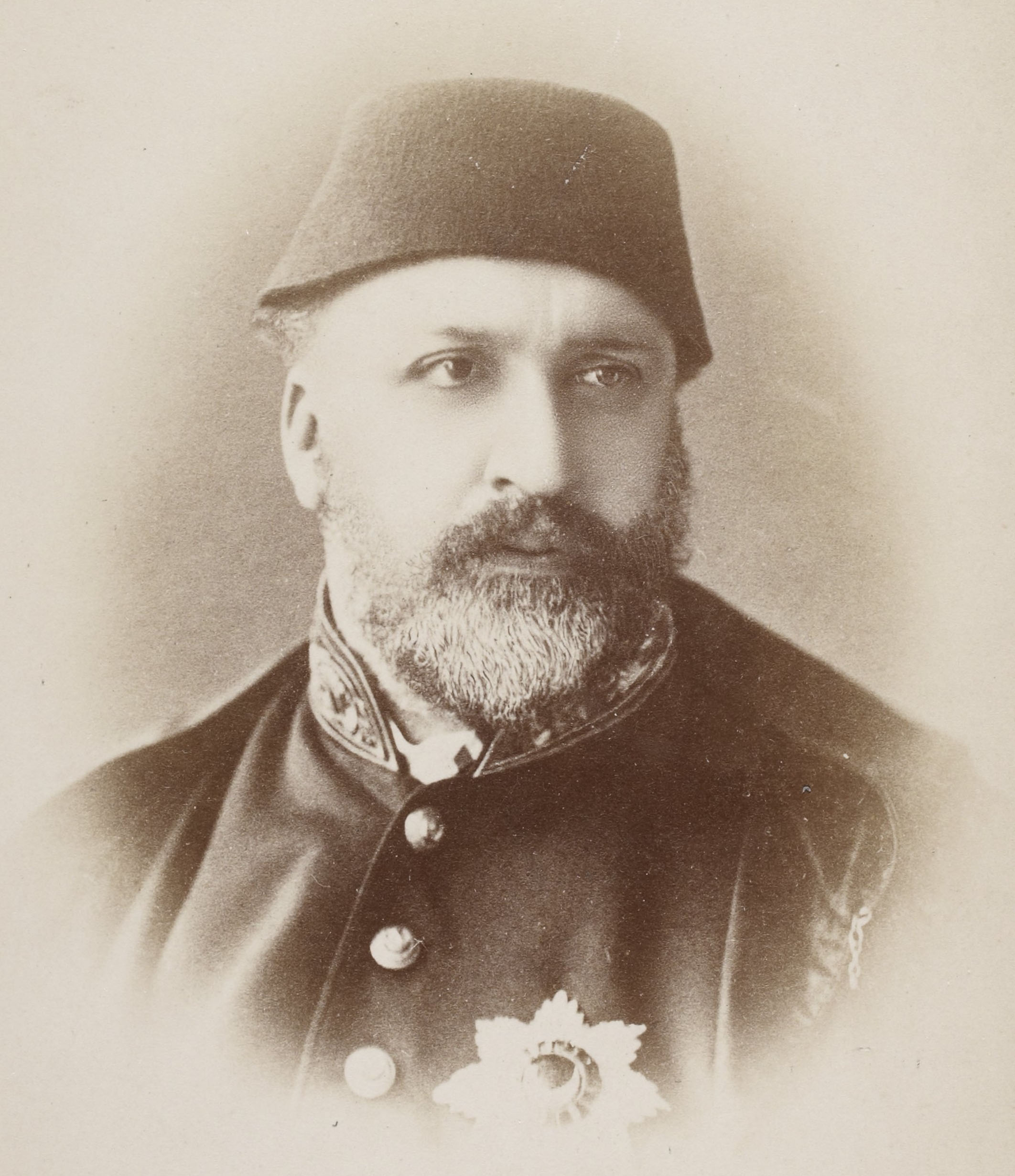

Sultan of the Ottoman Empire (Padishah)
- Reign: 25 June 1861 – 30 May 1876
- Predecessor: Abdulmejid I
- Successor: Murad V
- Grand viziers: See list: Mehmed Emin Âli Pasha; Mehmed Fuad Pasha; Yusuf Kamil Pasha; Mehmed Rushdi Pasha; Mahmud Nedim Pasha; Midhat Pasha; Ahmed Esad Pasha; Şirvanlı Mehmed Rüşdi Pasha; Hüseyin Avni Pasha

Ottoman Caliph (Amir al-Mu'minin)
- Predecessor: Abdulmejid I
- Successor: Murad V
- Born: 8 February 1830; Constantinople, Ottoman Empire
- Died: 4 June 1876 (aged 46); Feriye Palace, Constantinople, Ottoman Empire
- Burial: Tomb of Sultan Mahmud II, Fatih, Istanbul
- Consorts: Dürrinev Kadın; Edadil Kadın; Hayranidil Kadın; Neşerek Kadın; Gevheri Kadın; Yıldız Hanım
- Issue Among others: Şehzade Yusuf Izzeddin; Saliha Sultan; Şehzade Mahmud Celaleddin; Nazime Sultan; Abdulmejid II; Şehzade Mehmed Şevket; Esma Sultan; Emine Sultan; Şehzade Mehmed Seyfeddin
Names
- Abdülaziz Han bin Mahmud
- Dynasty: Ottoman
- Father: Mahmud II
- Mother: Pertevniyal Sultan
- Religion: Sunni Islam
- Tughra

Abdulaziz (Ottoman Turkish: عبد العزيز, romanized: ʿAbdü'l-ʿAzîz; Turkish: Abdülaziz; 8 February 1830 – 4 June 1876) was the sultan of the Ottoman Empire from 25 June 1861 to 30 May 1876, when he was overthrown in a government coup. He was a son of Sultan Mahmud II and succeeded his brother Abdulmejid I in 1861.

Abdulaziz's reign began during the Ottoman Empire's resurgence following the Crimean War and two decades of the Tanzimat reforms, though it was now reliant on European capital. He was the first Ottoman sultan who traveled to Western Europe in a diplomatic capacity, visiting a number of important European capitals including Paris, London, and Vienna in the summer of 1867. The decade after his ascension was dominated by the duo of Fuad Pasha and Aali Pasha, who accelerated reorganization of the Empire. The Vilayet Law was promulgated, Western codes were applied to more aspects of Ottoman law, and the millets were restructured. The issue of Tanzimat dualism continued to plague the empire, however.

The first semblance of an opposition party coalesced around detractors of Fuad and Aali, the Young Ottomans. Once they were dead by 1871, Abdul Aziz promulgated reactionary ministries and attempted personal rule, revealing his eccentricities. His autocracy became the target of the Young Ottomans, leading to demands for a constitution. In his last years as sultan, famine, economic crisis and default, diplomatic isolation, government dysfunction, and uprisings by Christian minorities culminated into a general international crisis known as the Great Eastern Crisis. Abdulaziz was deposed on 30 May 1876 by his ministers on the grounds of having mismanaged the economy, and was found dead from suicide six days later.

== Early life ==
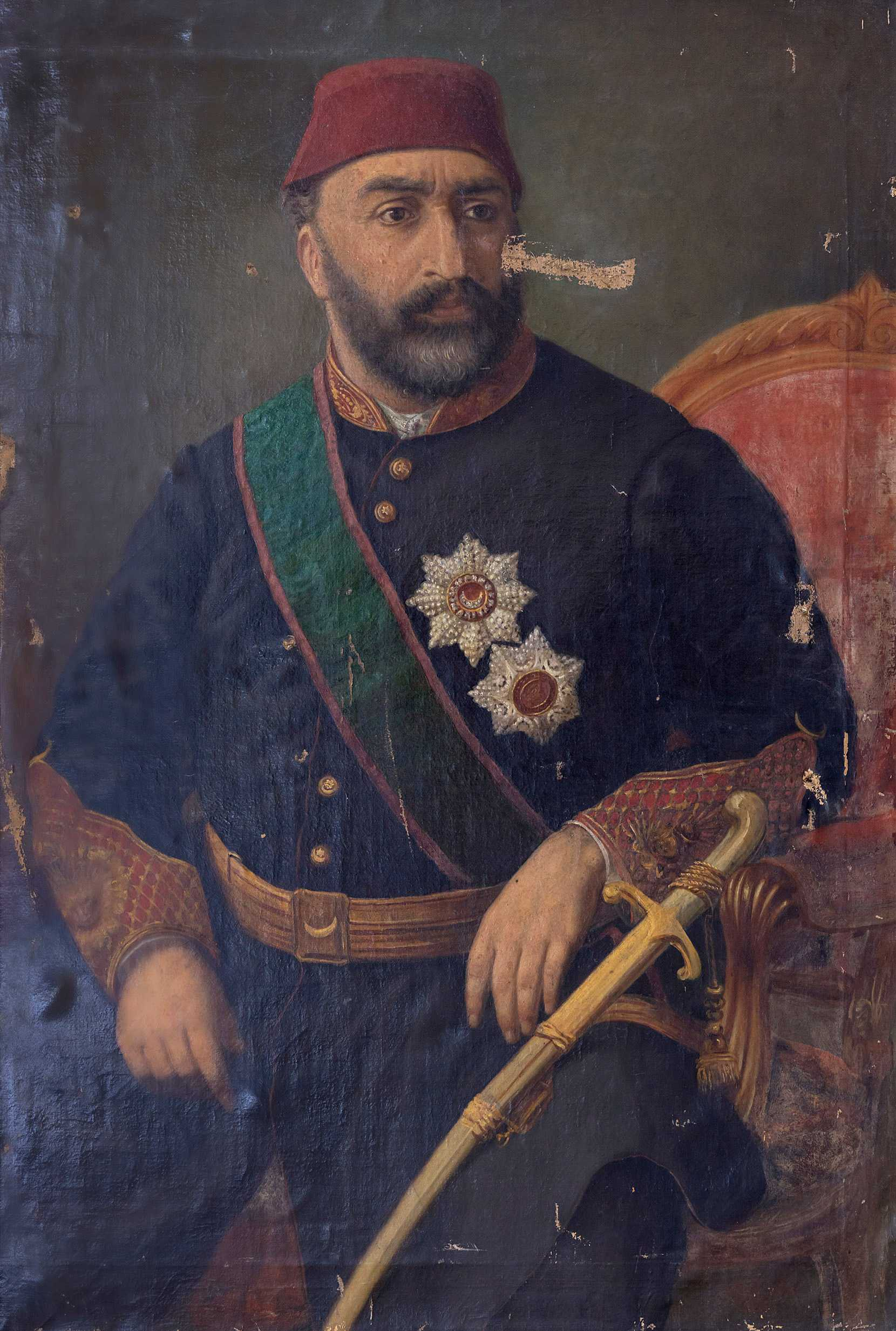
A portrait of Sultan Abdülaziz (1869)

Abdulaziz was born at Eyüp Palace, Constantinople (Istanbul) on 8 February 1830. His parents were Mahmud II and Pertevniyal Sultan, originally named Besime, a Circassian.

The Pertevniyal Valide Sultan Mosque was built under the patronage of his mother. The construction work began in November 1869 and the mosque was finished in 1871.

His paternal grandparents were Sultan Abdul Hamid I and Sultana Nakşidil Sultan. Several accounts identify his paternal grandmother with Aimée du Buc de Rivéry, a cousin of Empress Joséphine. Pertevniyal was a sister of Hushiyar Qadin, third wife of Ibrahim Pasha of Egypt. Hushiyar and Ibrahim were the parents of Isma'il Pasha.

Abdulaziz received an Ottoman education but was nevertheless an ardent admirer of the material progress that was being achieved in the West. He was the first Ottoman sultan who traveled to Western Europe, visiting a number of important European capitals including Paris, London, and Vienna in the summer of 1867.

In addition to his interest in literature, Abdulaziz was also a classical music composer. He took a special interest in documenting the Ottoman Empire. Some of his compositions, together with those of the other members of the Ottoman dynasty, have been collected in the album European Music at the Ottoman Court by the London Academy of Ottoman Court Music.

== Reign ==
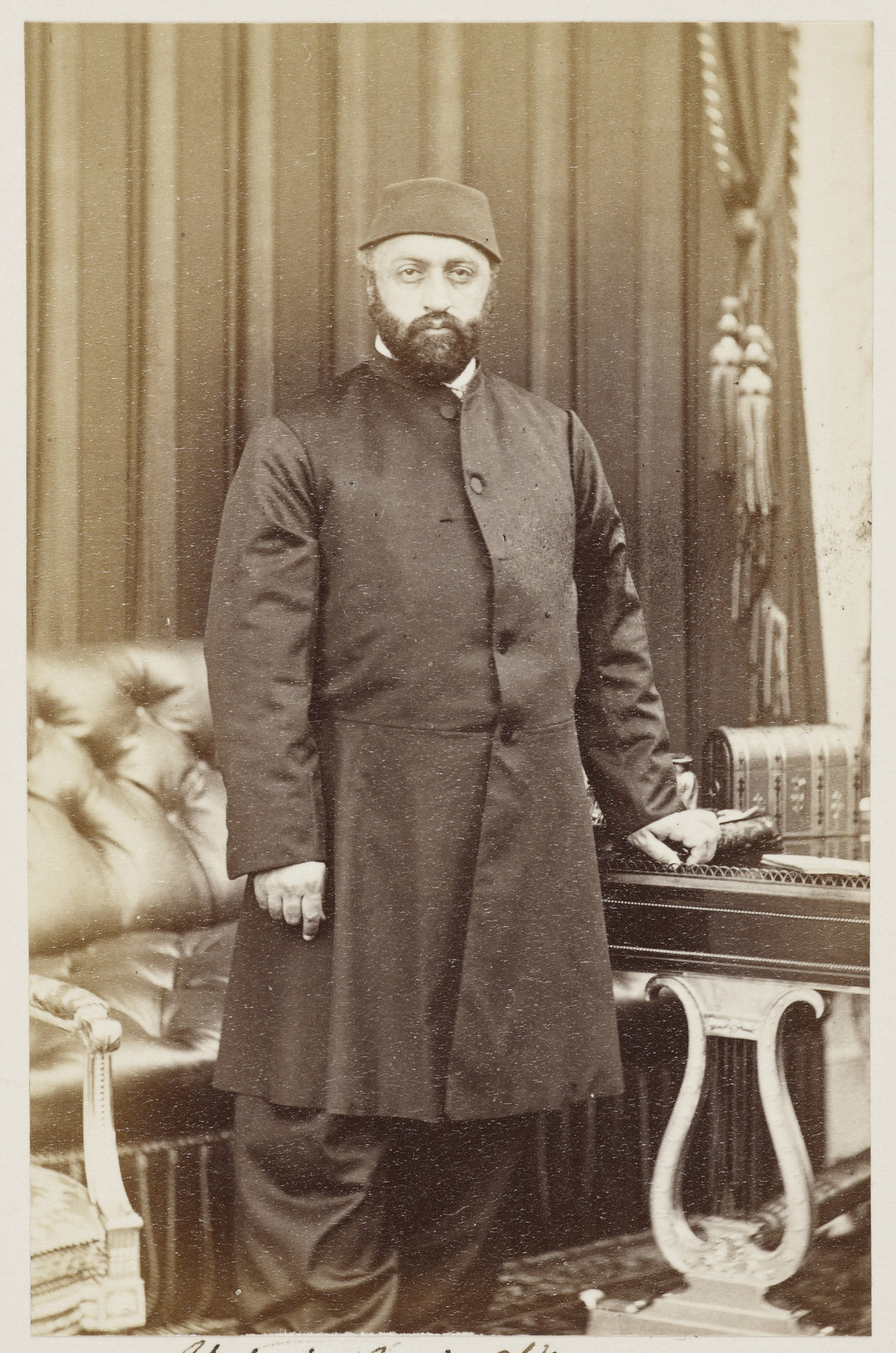
Sultan Abdulaziz during his visit to the United Kingdom in 1867

Between 1861 and 1871, the Tanzimat reforms which began during the reign of his brother Abdulmejid I were continued under the leadership of his chief ministers, Mehmed Fuad Pasha and Mehmed Emin Aali Pasha. New administrative districts (vilayets) were set up in 1864 and a Council of State was established in 1868. Public education was organized on the French model and Istanbul University was reorganised as a modern institution in 1861. He was also integral in establishing the first Ottoman civil code, the Mecelle. Under his reign, Turkey's first postage stamps were issued in 1863, and the Ottoman Empire joined the Universal Postal Union in 1875 as a founding member.

=== European tour ===
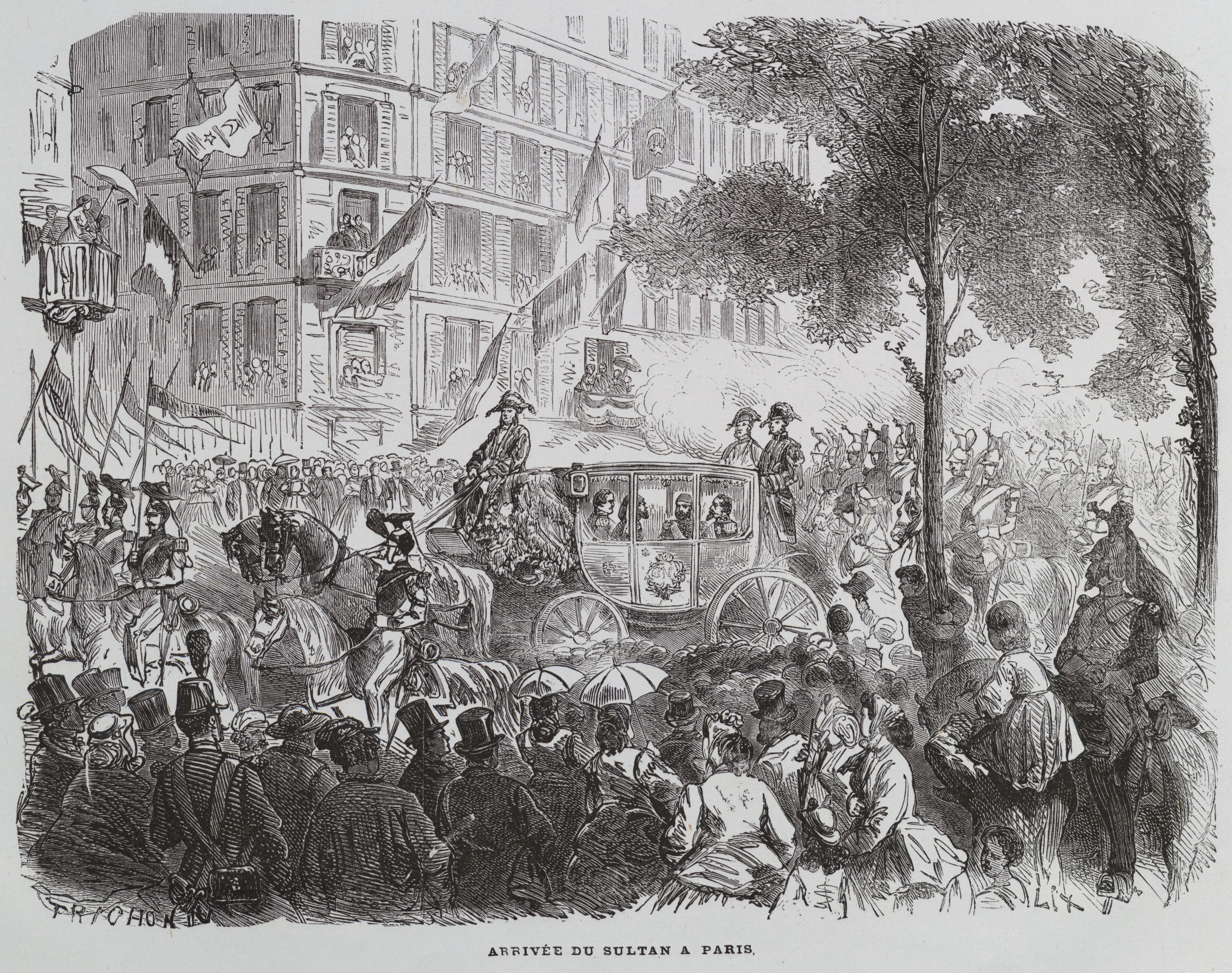
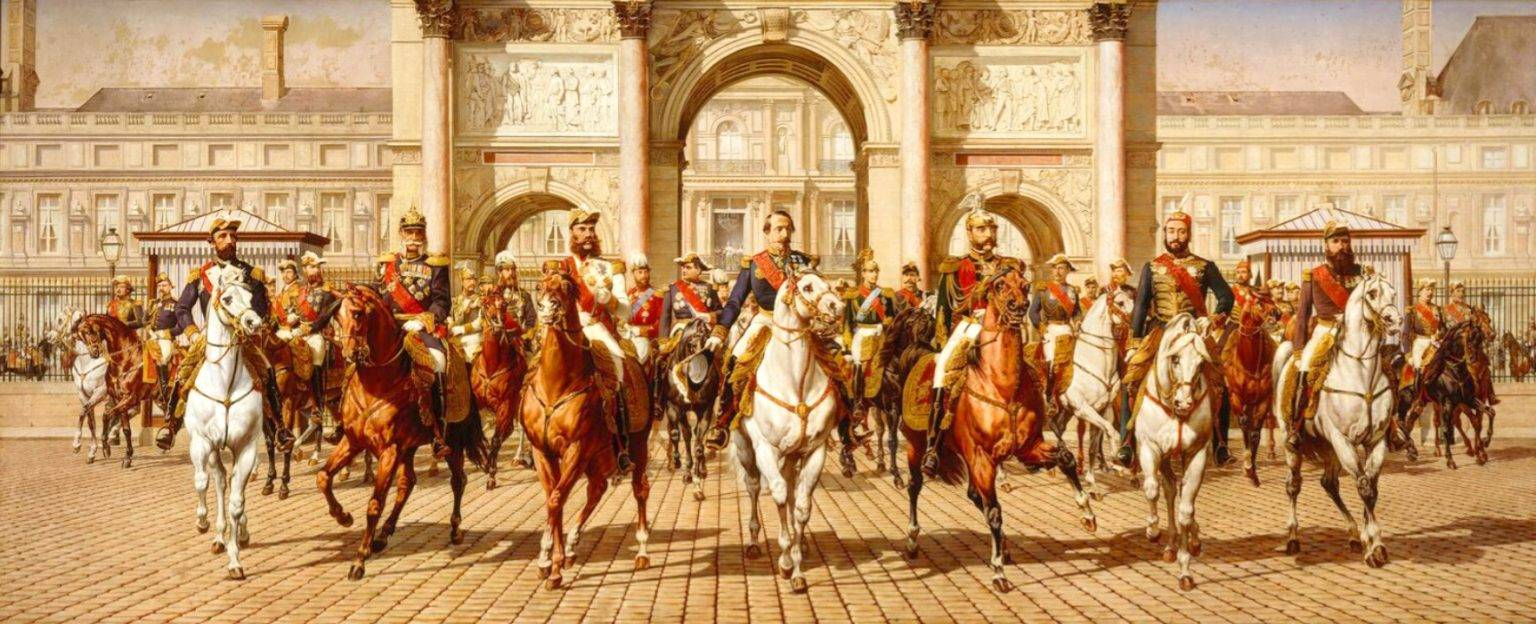
Sultan Abdulaziz, accompanied by Emperor Napoleon III, arrives in Paris in 1867 (top). The Kings of Europe are in Paris (Sultan Abdulaziz is second from right) for the opening of the Universal Exposition of 1867 (bottom).

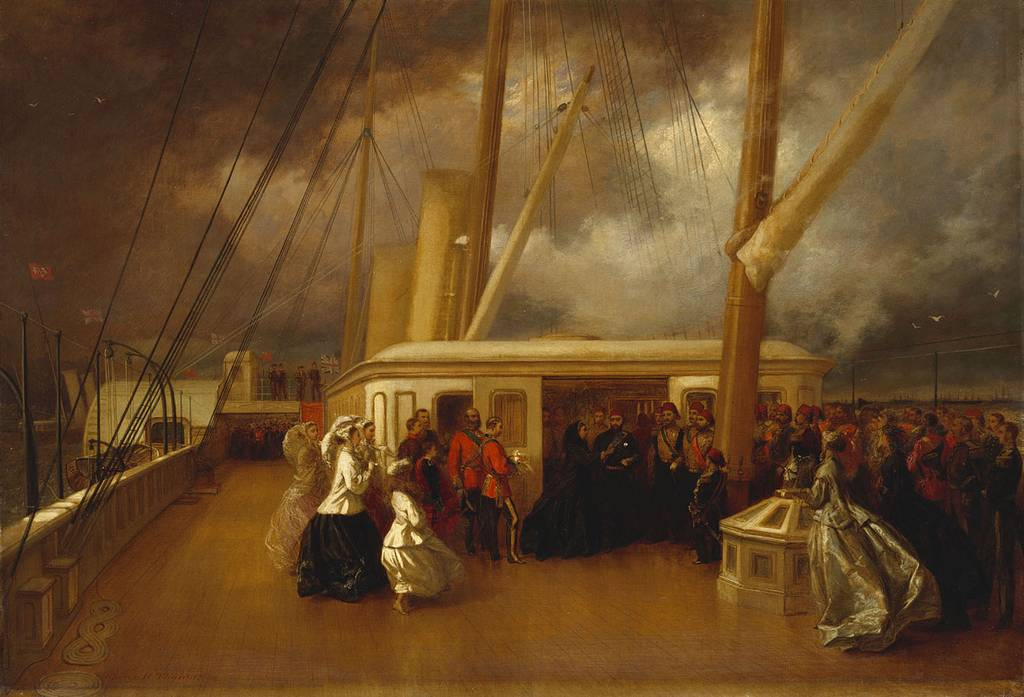
Queen Victoria and Sultan Abdulaziz on the royal yacht HMY Victoria and Albert during the Sultan's visit to the United Kingdom in 1867.

Abdulaziz cultivated good relations with France and the United Kingdom. In 1867 he was the first Ottoman sultan to visit Western Europe. Ostensibly he was to see the Paris exhibition of 1867 at Napoleon III's invitation, however the real goal was to reestablish Ottoman credit and forestall a Franco-Russian intervention in rebellious Crete. His voyage in visiting order (from 21 June 1867 to 7 August 1867): Istanbul – Messina – Naples – Toulon – Marseille – Paris – Boulogne – Dover – London – Dover – Calais – Brussels – Koblenz – Vienna – Budapest – Orșova – Vidin – Ruse – Varna – Istanbul. In London, he was made a Knight of the Garter by Queen Victoria and shown a Royal Navy Fleet Review with Ismail Pasha. He travelled by a private rail car, which today can be found in the Rahmi M. Koç Museum in Istanbul. His fellow Knights of the Garter created in 1867 were Charles Gordon-Lennox, 6th Duke of Richmond, Charles Manners, 6th Duke of Rutland, Henry Somerset, 8th Duke of Beaufort, Prince Arthur, Duke of Connaught and Strathearn (a son of Queen Victoria), Franz Joseph I of Austria and Alexander II of Russia. Impressed by the museums in Paris (30 June – 10 July 1867), London (12–23 July 1867) and Vienna (28–30 July 1867) he ordered the establishment of an Imperial Museum in Istanbul: the Istanbul Archaeology Museum.

In 1868, Abdulaziz received visits from Eugénie de Montijo, Empress consort of Napoleon III of France and other foreign monarchs on their way to the opening of the Suez Canal. He took Eugénie to see his mother in Dolmabahçe Palace. However, his mother Pertevniyal Sultan considered the presence of a foreign woman within her private quarters of the seraglio to be an insult. She reportedly slapped Eugénie across the face, which almost caused an international incident. According to another account, Pertevniyal was outraged by the forwardness of Eugénie in taking the arm of one of her sons while he gave a tour of the palace garden, and she gave the Empress a slap on the stomach as a possibly more subtly intended reminder that they were not in France.

=== Railroads ===
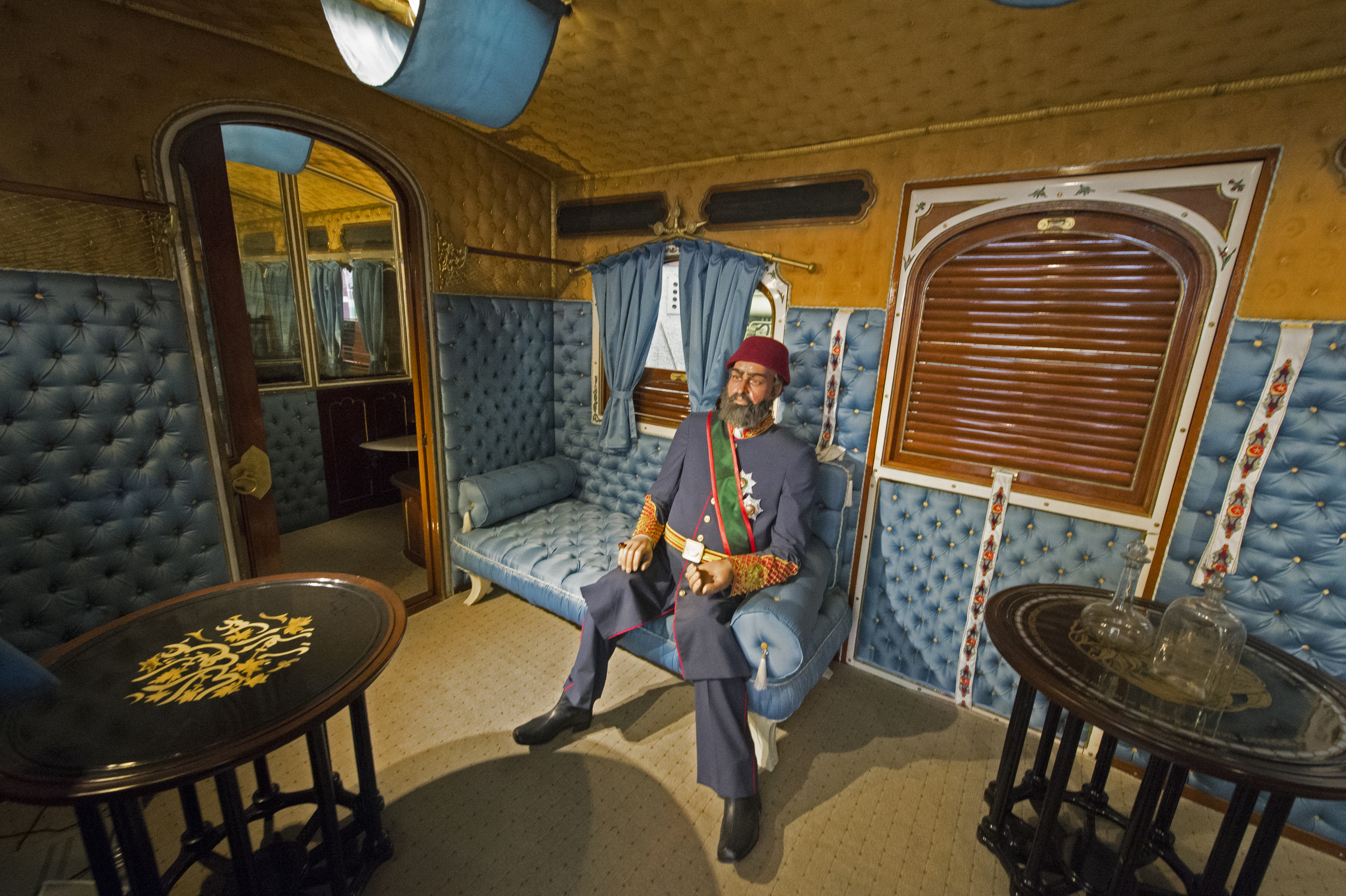
Imperial Coach used by Sultan Abdulaziz during his visit to Paris, London and Vienna in 1867, currently at the Rahmi M. Koç Museum in Istanbul.

The first Ottoman railroads were opened between İzmir–Aydın and Alexandria–Cairo in 1856, during the reign of Sultan Abdulmejid I. The first large railway terminal within present-day Turkey, the Alsancak Terminal in İzmir, was opened in 1858. However, these were individual, unconnected railroads, without a railway network. Sultan Abdulaziz established the first Ottoman railway networks. On 17 April 1869, the concession for the Rumelia Railway (i.e. Balkan Railways, Rumeli (Rumelia) meaning the Balkan peninsula in Ottoman Turkish) which connected Istanbul to Vienna was awarded to Baron Maurice de Hirsch (Moritz Freiherr Hirsch auf Gereuth), a Bavaria-born banker from Belgium. The project foresaw a railway route from Istanbul via Edirne, Plovdiv and Sarajevo to the shore of the Sava River. In 1873, the first Sirkeci Terminal in Istanbul was opened. The temporary Sirkeci terminal building was later replaced with the current one which was built between 1888 and 1890 (during the reign of Abdülhamid II) and became the final destination terminus of the Orient Express. In 1871, Sultan Abdulaziz established the Anatolia Railway. Construction works of the 1,435 mm (4 ft 8 1/2 in) standard gauge on the Asian side of Istanbul, from Haydarpaşa to Pendik, began in 1871. The line was opened on 22 September 1872. The railway was extended to Gebze, which opened on 1 January 1873. In August 1873 the railway reached Izmit. Another railway extension was built in 1871 to serve a populated area along Bursa and the Sea of Marmara. The Anatolia Railway was then extended to Ankara and eventually to Mesopotamia, Syria and Arabia during the reign of Sultan Abdulhamid II, with the completion of the Baghdad Railway and Hejaz Railway.

=== Further decline of the empire ===
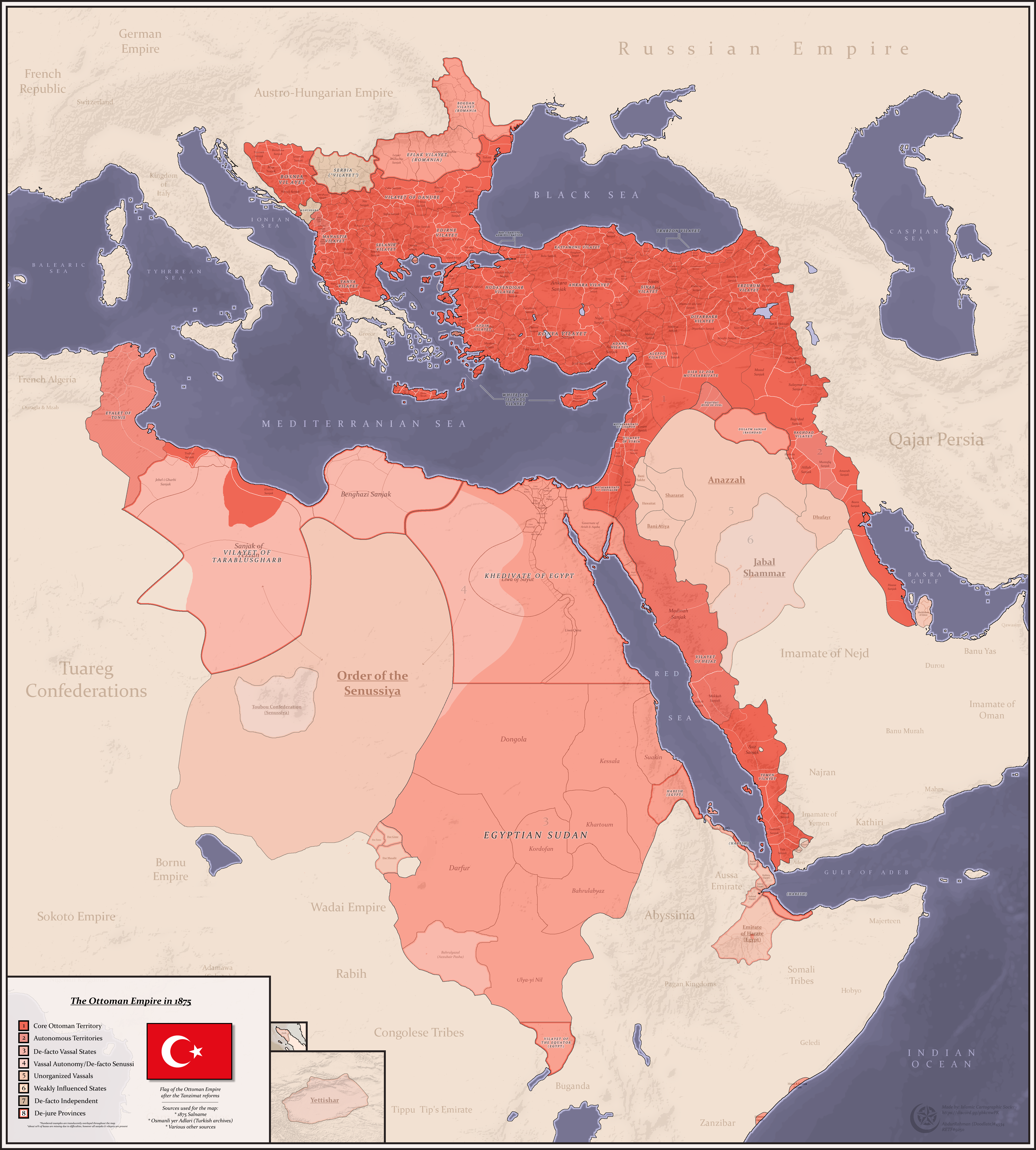
The Ottoman Empire in 1875

Also in 1867, Abdulaziz became the first Ottoman Sultan to formally recognize the title of Khedive (Viceroy) to be used by the Governor of the Ottoman Eyalet of Egypt and Sudan (1517–1867), which thus became the autonomous Ottoman Khedivate of Egypt and Sudan (1867–1914). Muhammad Ali Pasha and his descendants had been the governors of Ottoman Egypt and Sudan since 1805, but were willing to use the higher title of Khedive, which was unrecognized by the Ottoman government until 1867. In return, the first Khedive, Ismail Pasha, had agreed a year earlier (in 1866) to increase the annual tax revenues which Egypt and Sudan would provide for the Ottoman treasury. Between 1854 and 1894, the revenues from Egypt and Sudan were often declared as a surety by the Ottoman government for borrowing loans from British and French banks.

Abdulaziz gave special emphasis on modernizing the Ottoman Navy. In 1875, the Ottoman Navy had 21 battleships and 173 warships of other types, ranking as the third largest navy in the world after the British and French navies. His passion for the Navy, ships and sea can be observed in the wall paintings and pictures of the Beylerbeyi Palace, which was constructed during his reign. However, the large budget for modernizing and expanding the Navy, combined with the 1873–1875 Anatolian Famine which reduced the government's tax revenues, contributed to the financial difficulties that caused the Porte to declare a sovereign default with the "Ramazan Kanunnamesi" on 30 October 1875. The subsequent decision to increase agricultural taxes for paying the Ottoman public debt to foreign creditors (mainly British and French banks) triggered the Great Eastern Crisis in the empire's Balkan provinces. The crisis culminated in the Russo-Turkish War (1877–78) that devastated the already struggling Ottoman economy, which led to the establishment of the Ottoman Public Debt Administration in 1881, during the early years of Sultan Abdulhamid II's reign.

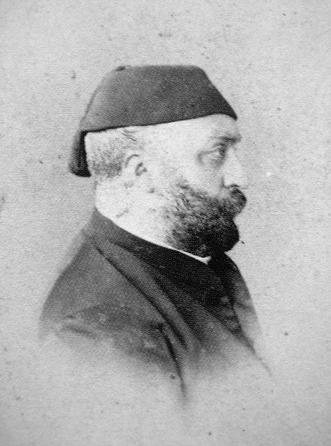
Sultan Abdulaziz in 1863

The global financial turmoil increased the importance for Britain of the sureties regarding the Ottoman tax revenues from Egypt and Sudan for the repayment of Ottoman debts to British banks. Combined with the strategically important Suez Canal which was opened in 1869, these sureties were influential in the British government's decision to occupy Egypt and Sudan in 1882, with the pretext of helping the Ottoman-Egyptian government to put down the ʻUrabi revolt (1879–1882). Egypt and Sudan (together with Cyprus) nominally remained Ottoman territories until 5 November 1914, when the British Empire declared war against the Ottoman Empire during World War I and changed the status of these territories as British protectorates (which was formally recognized by Turkey with Articles 17–21 of the Treaty of Lausanne in 1923).

By 1871, both Fuad Pasha and Aali Pasha were dead. The Second French Empire, the Western European model embraced by Sultan Abdulaziz, had been defeated in the Franco-Prussian War. Abdulaziz turned to the Russian Empire for friendship as unrest in the Balkan provinces continued. He increasingly relied on Mahmud Nedim Pasha, an incompetent statesman known as "Nedimoff" in the press for his Russophilia. In 1875, the Herzegovinian rebellion triggered further unrest in the Balkan provinces, beginning a general diplomatic crisis known as the Great Eastern Crisis. In 1876, the April Uprising saw insurrection spreading among the Bulgarians. Ill feeling mounted against Russia for its encouragement of the rebellions.

While no single event led to his deposition, the crop failure of 1873 and his lavish expenditures on the Ottoman Navy and on new palaces which he had built, along with mounting public debt, helped to create an atmosphere that conducted to the end of his reign. Abdulaziz was deposed by his ministers on 30 May 1876.

A constitutional committee headed by Midhat Pasha ran the country after his death, elevating his half-brother Murad V to the throne. However Murad V's mental health quickly deteriorated, resulting in another deposition after a 90-day reign. Abdul Hamid II was brought to the throne, and Turkey soon found itself at war with Russia without its traditional allies.

== Death ==
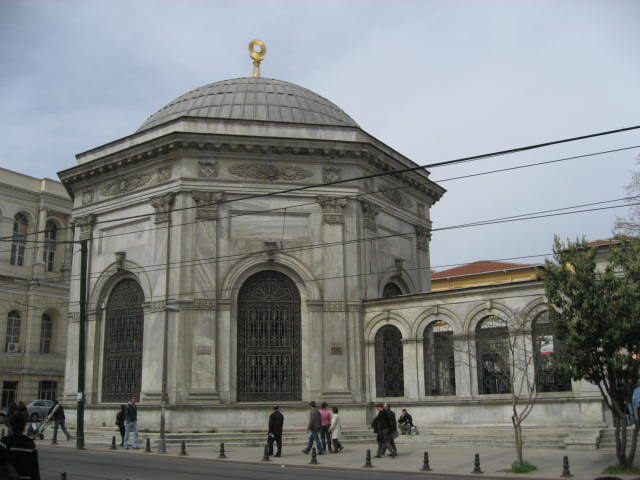
The türbe (mausoleum) of Sultan Mahmud II (his father) on Divan Yolu street, where Abdulaziz was also buried.

Following Sultan Abdulaziz's dethronement, he was taken into a room at the Topkapı Palace, which happened to be the same room that Sultan Selim III was murdered in. The room caused him to be concerned for his life and he subsequently requested to be moved to Beylerbeyi Palace. His request was denied for the palace was considered inconvenient for his situation and he was moved to Feriye Palace instead. He nevertheless had grown increasingly nervous and paranoid about his security. In the morning of 4 June, Abdulaziz asked for a pair of scissors to trim his beard. Shortly after this, he was found dead in a pool of blood flowing from two wounds in his arms.

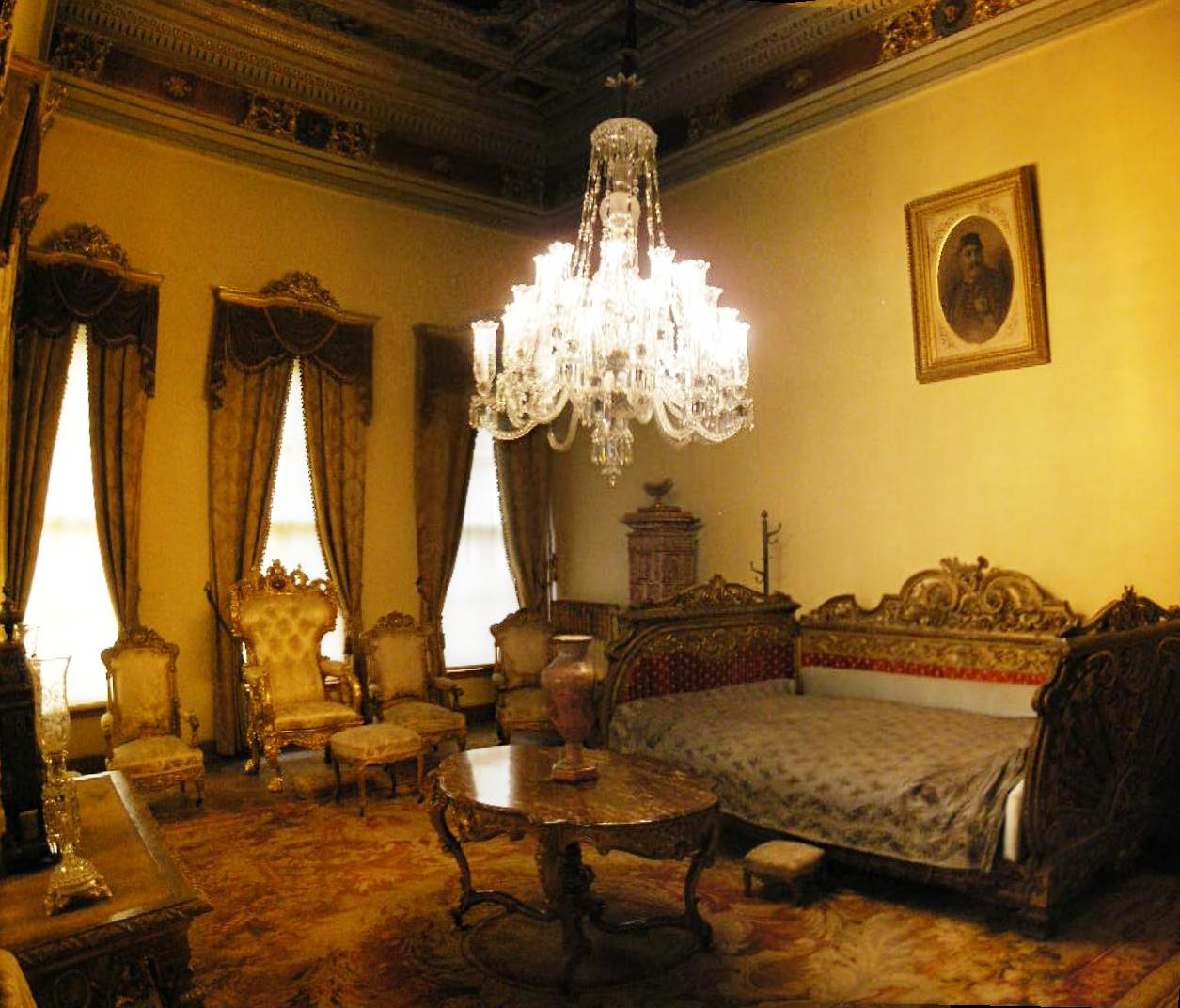
Bedroom of Sultan Abdulaziz at Dolmabahçe Palace in Istanbul.

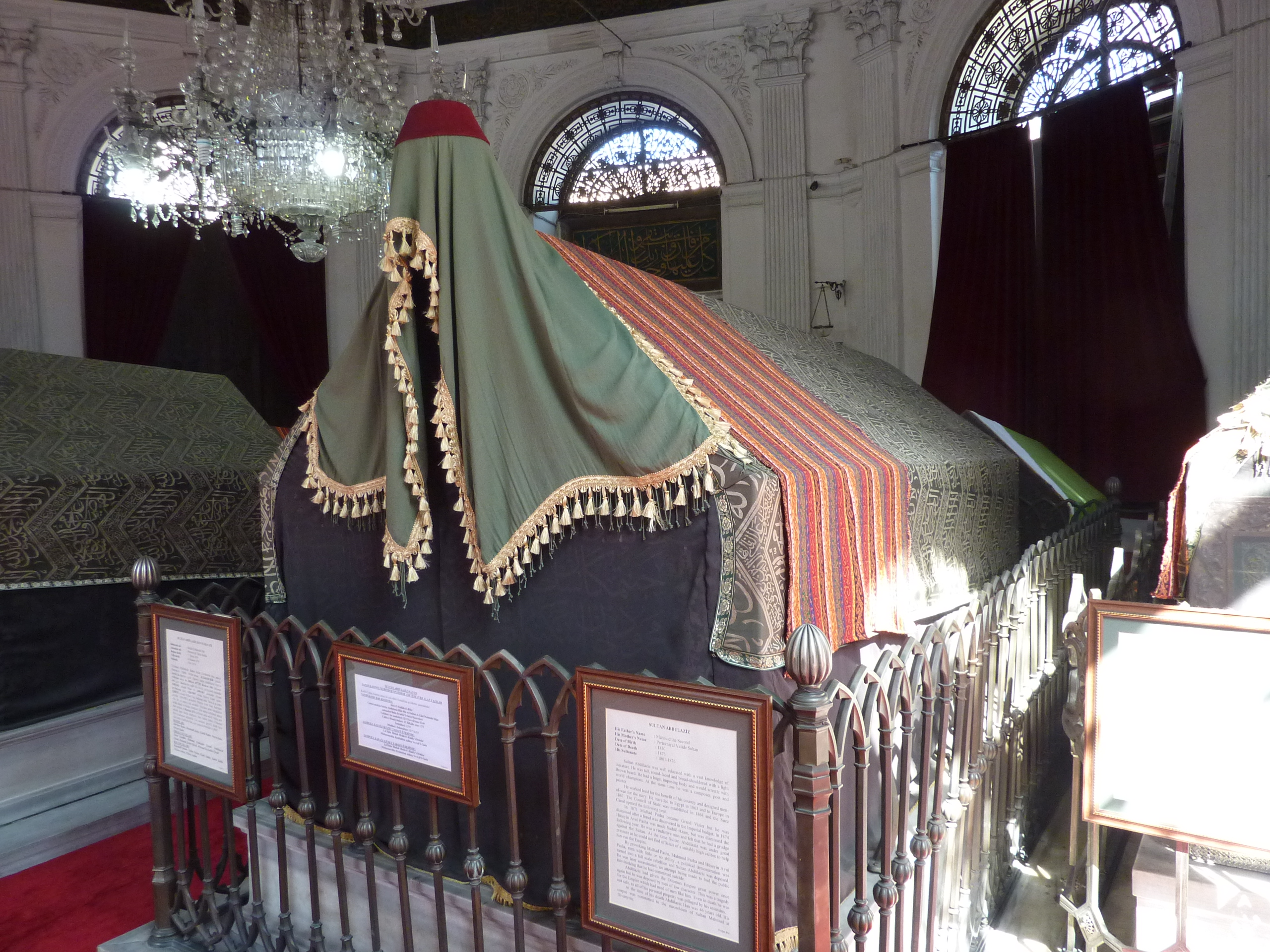
Sarcophagus of Sultan Abdulaziz in the mausoleum of his father, Sultan Mahmud II. Some of the sultans' descendants are also buried nearby.

Several physicians were allowed to examine his body. Among which "Dr. Marco, Nouri, A. Sotto, Physician attached to the Imperial and Royal Embassy of Austria-Hungary; Dr. Spagnolo, Marc Markel, Jatropoulo, Abdinour, Servet, J. de Castro, A. Marroin, Julius Millingen, C. Caratheodori; E. D. Dickson, Physician of the British Embassy; Dr. O. Vitalis, Physician of the Sanitary Board; Dr. E. Spadare, J. Nouridjian, Miltiadi Bey, Mustafa, Mehmed" certified that the death had been "caused by the loss of blood produced by the wounds of the blood-vessels at the joints of the arms" and that "the direction and nature of the wounds, together with the instrument which is said to have produced them, lead us to conclude that suicide had been committed". One of those physicians also stated that "His skin was very pale, and entirely free from bruises, marks or spots of any kind whatever. There was no lividity of the lips indicating suffocation nor any sign of pressure having been applied to the throat". Abdulaziz's death was documented as a suicide.

=== Conspiracy theories ===
There are several sources claiming the death of Abdulaziz was due to an assassination. Islamic nationalist author Necip Fazıl Kısakürek claimed that it was a clandestine operation carried out by the British.

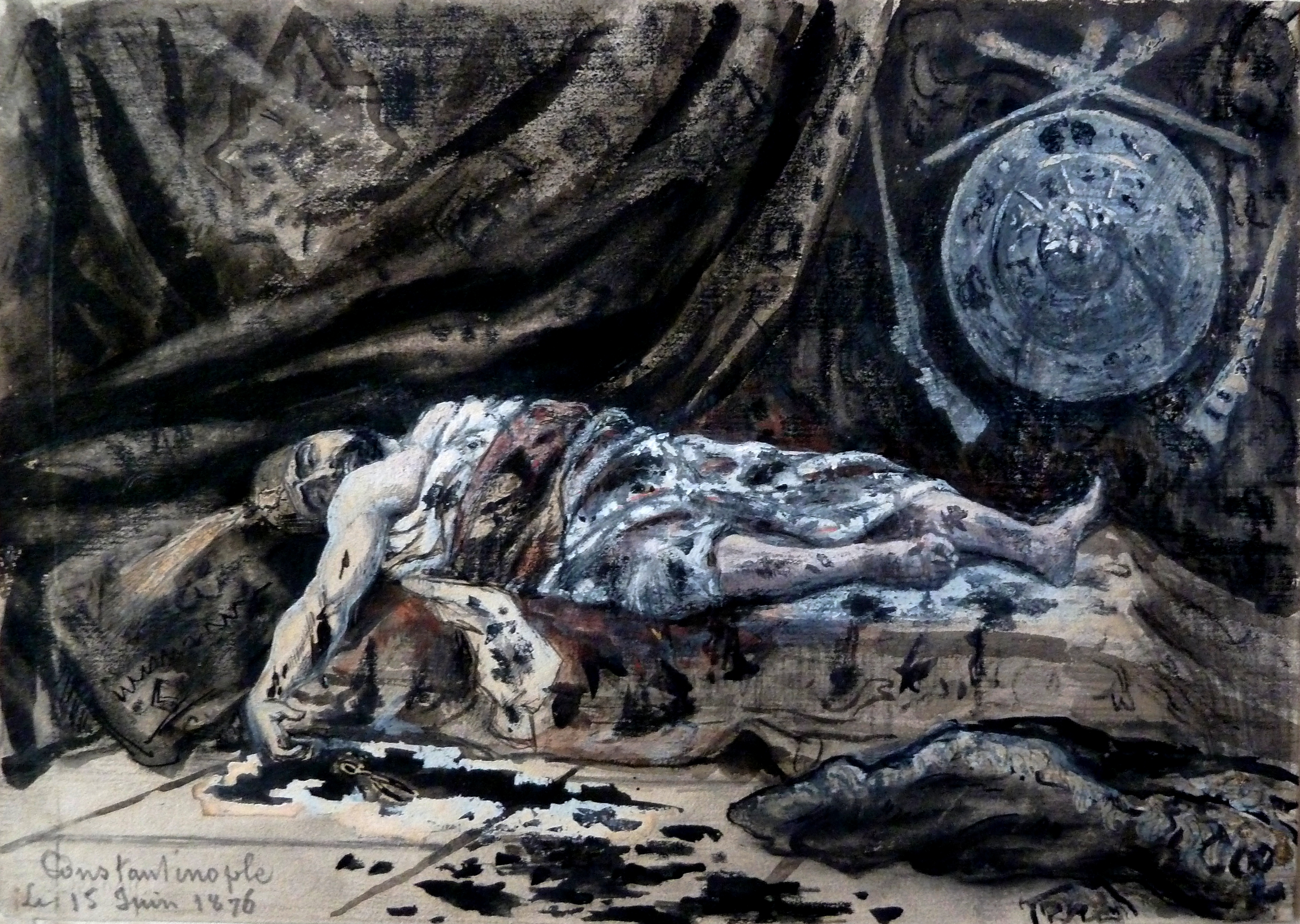
Death of Abdulaziz (1876), an imaginary depiction by French artist Victor Masson (1849–1917).

Another similar claim is based on the book The Memoirs of Sultan Abdulhamid II. In the book, which turned out to be a fraud, the author claims that Sultan Murad V had begun to show signs of paranoia, madness, and continuous fainting and vomiting until the day of his coronation, and he even threw himself into a pool yelling at his guards to protect his life. High-ranking politicians of the time were afraid the public would become outraged and revolt to bring Abdulaziz back to power. Thus, they arranged the assassination of Abdulaziz by cutting his wrists and announced that "he committed suicide". This book of memoir was commonly referred to as a first-hand testimony of the assassination of Abdulaziz. Yet it was proven, later on, that Abdulhamid II never wrote nor dictated such a document.

Abdülaziz's family was also convinced that he was murdered, according to the statements of one of his consorts Neşerek Kadın and his daughter Nazime Sultan. Neşerek herself died just days later, and her brother Hasan, in an act of vengeance, raided a cabinet meeting, killing and injuring several ministers.

== Honours, emblem, flag ==
=== Honours ===
- Mexican Empire: Grand Cross of the Mexican Eagle, with Collar, 1865
- United Kingdom: Stranger Knight Companion of the Garter, 14 August 1867
- Kingdom of Portugal: Grand Cross of the Tower and Sword
- Spain: Knight of the Golden Fleece, 24 June 1870
- Oldenburg: Grand Cross of the Order of Duke Peter Friedrich Ludwig, with Golden Crown, 14 December 1874

=== Emblem and flag ===
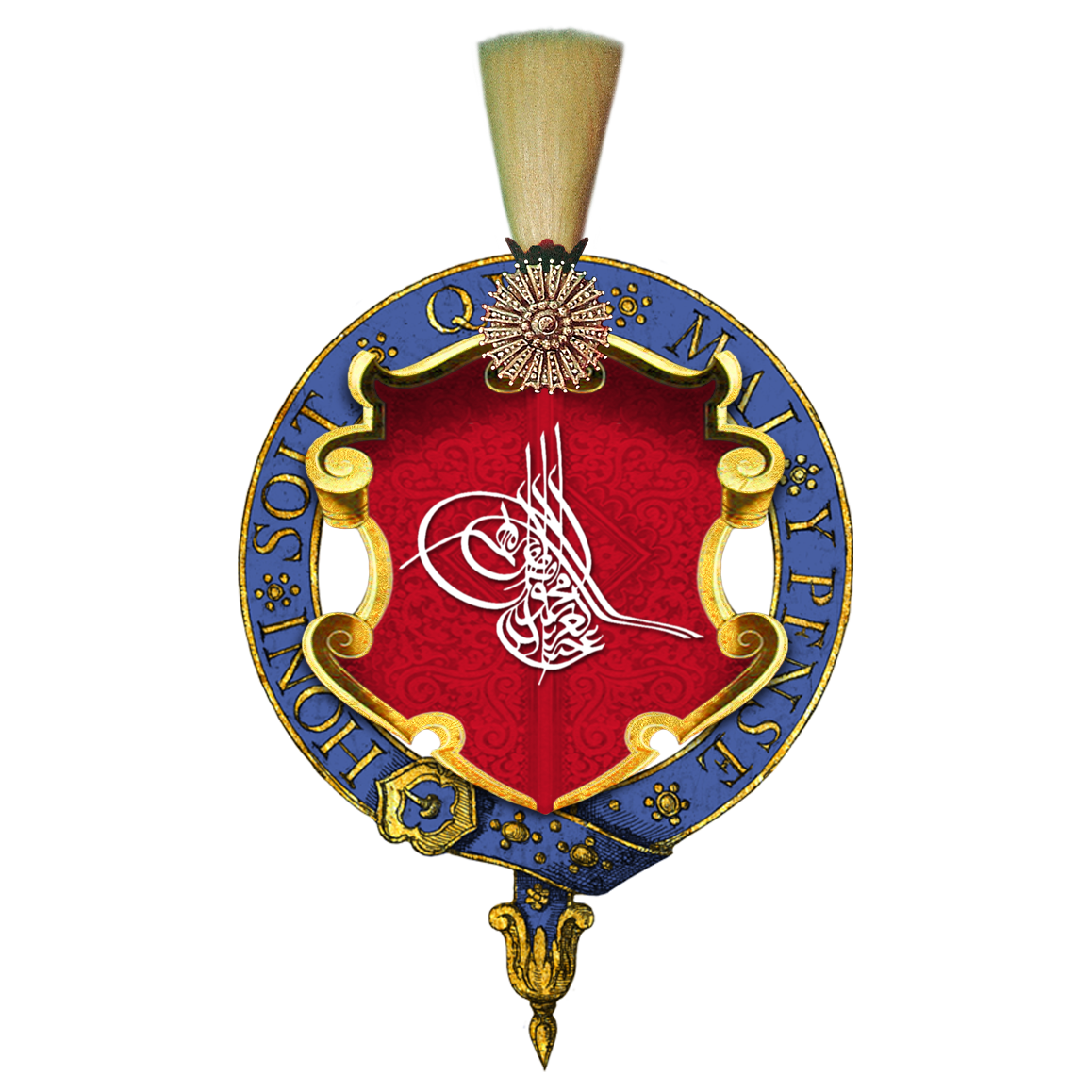
Order of the Garter emblem of Sultan Abdul Aziz

Naval ensign

== Family ==
Abdulaziz's harem was notorious because, although slavery in the Ottoman Empire had been formally abolished, his mother Pertevniyal Sultan continued to send him slave girls from the Caucasus via the Circassian slave trade.

=== Consorts ===
Abdülaziz had six consorts:

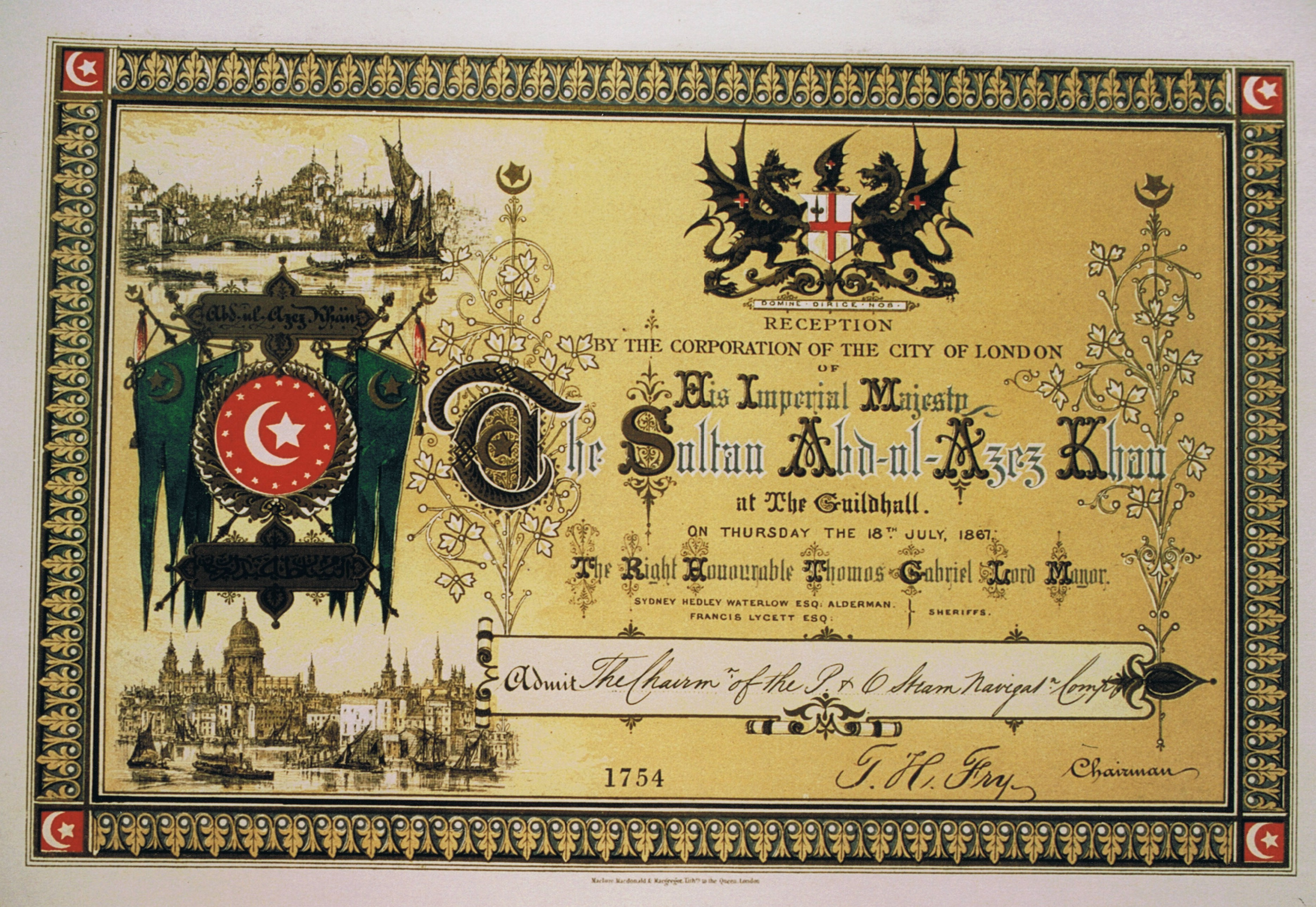
Admission ticket to Lord Mayor Thomas Gabriel's reception of H.I.M. The Sultan Abd-ul-Aziz Khan at Guildhall on 18 July 1867, issued to the chairman of P&O.

- Dürrinev Kadın (15 March 1835 - 4 December 1895). BaşKadin. Called also Dürrunev Kadın. Georgian, born Princess Melek Dziapş-lpa, before becoming a consort she was a lady-in-waiting to Servetseza Kadin, consort of Abdülmecid I. She had two sons and a daughter.
- Edadil Kadın (1845 - 12 December 1875). Second Kadın. She was Abkhazian, born Princess Aredba. She became Abdülaziz's consort at the time of his accession to the throne. She had a son and a daughter.
- Hayranidil Kadın (2 November 1846 - 26 November 1898). Second Kadın after Edadil's death. She perhaps was of slave origin. She had a son and a daughter.
- Neşerek Kadın (1848 - 11 June 1876). Third Kadin. Called also Nesrin Kadın or Nesteren Kadin. Circassian, born in Sochi as Princess Zevş-Barakay. She had a son and a daughter.
- Gevheri Kadın (8 July 1856 - 6 September 1884). Fourth Kadın. She was Abkhazian and her real name was Emine Hanim. She had a son and a daughter.
- Yıldız Hanim. Baş Ikbal. Sister of Safinaz Nurefsun Kadın, consort of Abdülhamid II. She had two daughters.

In addition to these, Abdülaziz planned to marry the Egyptian princess Tawhida Hanim, daughter of the Egyptian Khedive Isma'il Pasha. His Grand Vizier, Mehmed Fuad Pasha, was opposed to marriage and wrote a note for the sultan explaining that marriage would be politically counterproductive and would give Egypt an undue advantage. However, the Grand Chamberlain, instead of handing the note to the sultan, read it to him in public, humiliating him. Although the marriage project was abandoned, Fuad was fired for the accident.

=== Sons ===
Abdülaziz had six sons:

- Şehzade Yusuf Izzeddin (11 October 1857 - 1 February 1916) - with Dürrinev Kadın. Favorite son of his father, he was born when Abdülaziz was still a prince and therefore was kept hidden until his accession to the throne. During his reign, Abdülaziz unsuccessfully attempted to change the law of succession to allow him to inherit the throne. He had six consorts, two sons and two daughters.
- Şehzade Mahmud Celaleddin (14 November 1862 - 1 September 1888) - with Edadil Kadin. He was vice admiral, pianist and flutist. He was the favorite nephew of Adile Sultan, who dedicated several poetic components to him. He had a consort but no child.
- Şehzade Mehmed Selim (28 October 1866 - 21 October 1867) - with Dürrinev Kadın. Born and died in Dolmabahçe Palace, buried in Mahmud II mausoleum.
- Abdülmecid II (29 May 1868 - 23 August 1944) - with Hayranidil Kadin. He never became sultan due to the abolition of the Sultanate in 1922, and was the last caliph of the Ottoman Empire.
- Şehzade Mehmed Şevket (5 June 1872 - 22 October 1899) - with Neşerek Kadın. Parentless at the age of four, he was welcomed in Yıldız Palace by Abdülhamid II, who raised him with his children. He had a consort and a son.
- Şehzade Mehmed Seyfeddin (22 September 1874 - 19 October 1927) - with Gevheri Kadin. Fatherless at the Age of two, he was welcomed by Şehzade Yusuf Izzeddin. Vice admiral and musician. He had four consorts, three sons and a daughter.

=== Daughters ===
Abdülaziz had seven daughters:

- Fatma Saliha Sultan (10 August 1862 - 1941) - with Dürrinev Kadın. She married once and had a daughter.
- Nazime Sultan (February 25, 1866 - 9 November 1947) - with Hayranidil Kadin. She married once but had no children.
- Emine Sultan (30 November 1866 - 23 January 1867) - with Edadil Kadin. Born and died in Dolmabahçe Palace. Buried in the Mahmud II mausoleum.
- Esma Sultan (21 March 1873 - 7 May 1899) - with Gevheri Kadin. Fatherless at the age of three, she was welcomed with her mother by her half-brother Şehzade Yusuf Izzedin. She married once and had four sons and a daughter. She died in childbirth.
- Fatma Sultan (1874–1875) - with Yıldız Hanim. She was born and died in Dolmabahçe Palace, buried in Mahmud II mausoleum.
- Emine Sultan (24 August 1874 - 29 January 1920) - with Neşerek Kadın. Parentless at the age of two, she was welcomed with her mother by her half-brother Şehzade Yusuf Izzedin. She married once and had a daughter.
- Münire Sultan (1876/1877 - 1877) - with Yıldız Hanim. She was born posthumously and died as a newborn.

== See also ==
- Imperial Firman of 27 May 1866

== Annotations ==
1. At the time of his accession to the throne in 1861, he had two kadıns. Between 1861 and 1867, he had three kadıns. In November 1872, there were four kadıns and one ikbal.

== Sources ==
- Brookes, Douglas Scott (2010). The Concubine, the Princess, and the Teacher: Voices from the Ottoman Harem. University of Texas Press. ISBN 978-0-292-78335-5.
- Uçan, Lâle (2019). Son Halife Abdülmecid Efendi'nin Hayatı - Şehzâlik, Veliahtlık ve Halifelik Yılları (PDF) (PhD Thesis). Istanbul University Institute of Social Sciences. Archived (PDF) from the original on 9 October 2022.
- Uluçay, M. Çağatay (2011). Padişahların kadınları ve kızları. Ötüken. ISBN 978-9-754-37840-5. OCLC 854893416.

Abdulaziz House of Osman Born: 8 February 1830 Died: 4 June 1876
Regnal titles
Preceded by Abdulmejid I	Sultan of the Ottoman Empire; 25 June 1861 – 30 May 1876	Succeeded by Murad V
Sunni Islam titles
Preceded by Abdulmejid I	Caliph of the Ottoman Caliphate; 25 June 1861 – 30 May 1876	Succeeded by Murad V
