= Neşerek Kadın =

Consort of Ottoman Sultan Abdülaziz (died 1876)

- Born: Nesrin Zevş-Barakay Hanim; 1848; Sochi, Circassia
- Died: 11 June 1876 (aged 27–28); Feriye Palace, Constantinople, Ottoman Empire (now Istanbul, Turkey)
- Burial: Imperial ladies mausoleum, New Mosque, Istanbul
- Spouse: Abdulaziz (m. 1868; died 1876)
- Issue: Şehzade Mehmed Şevket; Emine Sultan
Names
- Turkish: Neşerek Kadın; Ottoman Turkish: نسرین قادین
- House: Zevş-Barakay (by birth); Ottoman (by marriage)
- Father: Ismail Zevş-Barakay
- Religion: Sunni Islam

Neşerek Kadın (Ottoman Turkish: نشرک قادین; "joy" or "wild rose"; 1848 – 11 June 1876), born Nesrin Zevş-Barakay Hanim, was a consort of Sultan Abdulaziz of the Ottoman Empire.

== Early life ==
Of Circassian origin, Neşerek Kadın (called also Nesrin Kadın or Nesteren Kadın) was the daughter of Gazi Ismail Bey Zevş-Barakay. She was born in Sochi in 1848. She had two brothers, Hasan Bey (1850 – 1876), and Osman Pasha (1851 – 1892). Her aunt was the wife of Ateş Mehmed Pasha. Her birth name was Nesrin Zevş-Barakay Hanim.

== Marriage ==
Neşerek married Abdulaziz in 1868 at the Dolmabahçe Palace, and was given the title of "Fourth Kadın". She gave birth to her first child, a son, Şehzade Mehmed Şevket, on 5 June 1872. Two years later, on 24 August 1874, she gave birth to her second child, a daughter, Emine Sultan. In 1875, she was elevated to the title of "Third Kadın".

Abdulaziz was deposed by his ministers on 30 May 1876, his nephew Murad V becoming the Sultan. He was transferred to Feriye Palace the next day. The women of Abdulaziz's entourage didn't want to leave the Dolmabahçe Palace. So they were grabbed by hand and were sent out to the Feriye Palace. In the process, they were searched from head to toe and everything of value was taken from them. Neşerek was forcibly taken out of the palace by Prime Aide Sami Bey, wearing only a shawl, apparently because she had tried to hide royal jewels inside her clothes. Because of the horrible weather of that night, she fell ill and was carried on a stretcher to the caique, that was to take her to the Feriye Palace. Someone even snatched the shawl that was wrapped around her. On 4 June 1876, Abdulaziz died under mysterious circumstances.

== Death ==
Neşerek Kadın died seven days after Abdulaziz's death on 11 June 1876 at the Feriye Palace, seriously ill. Since the night of the deposition, she had been shattered by sadness for Abdülaziz's death and convinced that he had been murdered. According to historian Alan Palmer, she instead apparently died in childbirth; however, there had not been a trace in sources of a third child or pregnancy. Her son was welcomed by Abdülhamid II, the new sultan and nephew of Abdülaziz, and her daughter by Şehzade Yusuf Izzeddin, Abdülaziz's eldest son. She was buried in the mausoleum of imperial ladies, located at New Mosque, Istanbul.

Four days after her death, on 15 June 1876, her brother, Hasan Bey, attempted to assassinate a large number of ministers meeting at the mansion of Midhat Pasha, perhaps to avenge her sister. He was tried and executed on 18 June 1876.

== Issue ==
Name	Birth	Death	Notes
Şehzade Mehmed Şevket	5 June 1872	22 October 1899	married once, and had issue, one son
Emine Sultan	24 August 1874	29 January 1920	married once, and had issue, one daughter

== See also ==
- Kadın (title)
- List of consorts of the Ottoman sultans
- Ottoman Imperial Harem

== Annotations ==
1. She is also called Nesrin or Nesteren.

== Sources ==
- Brookes, Douglas Scott (2010). The Concubine, the Princess, and the Teacher: Voices from the Ottoman Harem. University of Texas Press. ISBN 978-0-292-78335-5.
- Sakaoğlu, Necdet (2008). Bu mülkün kadın sultanları: Vâlide sultanlar, hâtunlar, hasekiler, kadınefendiler, sultanefendiler. Oğlak Yayıncılık. ISBN 978-9-753-29623-6.
- Uçan, Lâle (2019b). Son Halife Abdülmecid Efendi'nin Hayatı - Şehzâlik, Veliahtlık ve Halifelik Yılları (PDF) (PhD Thesis). Istanbul University Institute of Social Sciences. Archived from the original (PDF) on 2020-11-27.
- Uluçay, Mustafa Çağatay (2011). Padişahların kadınları ve kızları. Ankara: Ötüken. ISBN 978-9-754-37840-5.
