= Ministry of Foreign Affairs (Ottoman Empire) =

Imperial ministry of the Ottoman Empire

- Ottoman Turkish: امورِ خارجيه نظارتی; Umur-ı Hariciye Nezâreti

Agency overview
- Formed: 1836
- Superseding agency: Ministry of Foreign Affairs of the Republic of Turkey (2 May 1920)
- Jurisdiction: Ottoman Empire
- Headquarters: Sublime Porte, Constantinople
- Minister responsible: Ahmed Izzet Pasha ( 1923 ) (last Minister)
- Parent agency: Grand Vezierate

The Ministry of Foreign Affairs (Ottoman Turkish: خارجيه نظارتی; Turkish: Hariciye Nezâreti; French: Ministère des Affaires Étrangères) was the department of the Imperial Government responsible for the foreign relations of the Ottoman Empire, from its establishment in 1836 to its abolition in 1922. Before 1836, foreign relations were managed by the Reis ül-Küttab, who was replaced by a Western-style ministry as part of the Tanzimat modernization reforms. The successor of the Ottoman Ministry of Foreign Affairs is the Ministry of Foreign Affairs of the Turkish Republic.

French was officially the working language of the ministry in the period after the Crimean War.

== History ==
Foreign relations were previously managed by the Reis ül-Küttab, a position within the Imperial Council, and then the Porte.

During the Tanzimat era, the Ottoman Foreign Ministry turned out to have more powers than typical foreign ministries. In addition to its eponymous responsibilities, it had some powers over internal reform legislation, and governed over non-Muslim and foreign subjects. The ministry administered foreign commerce in addition to its political relations. A large part of the oversized responsibility of this ministry had to do with the prominence of Mustafa Reşid Pasha, whose legacy as long time foreign minister held great inertia.

Many of the "Men of the Tanzimat," statesmen who defined reorganization and reform efforts during the mid-19th century, had their beginnings in the Translation Office, and would alternate between being Grand Vizier and Foreign Minister: Mustafa Reşit Pasha served as Minister of Foreign Affairs 4 times and as Grand Vizier 6 times. Aali Pasha served as Minister of Foreign Affairs 8 times and as Grand Vizier 5 times, while Fuat Pasha served as Minister of Foreign Affairs 5 times and as Grand Vizier twice.

Non-Muslim Ottoman were also appointed Foreign Minister in four instances. Alexander Karatheodori Pasha and then Yannis Sava Pasha (Greek) conducted the negotiations for the Treaty of Berlin from 1878–1879, Gabriel Noradoungian (Armenian Apostolic) in 1912–1913, and Yusuf Franko Pasha Coussa (Catholic Greek) in 1919.

Ahmed İzzet Pasha, was the last Minister of Foreign Affairs of the Ottoman Empire. After the foundation of the Republic, the Ministry of Foreign Affairs was moved to Ankara and was renamed twice: from Hariciye Nezareti, it was first Hariciye Vekaleti until taking its modern name Dışişleri Bakanlığı.

The ministry shared the Bâb-ı Âli building with the Grand Vizier.

== Organisation ==
According to Shaw and Shaw, during the Tanzimat era, the ministry was divided into two departments, a foreign section and a secondary section. The foreign section dealt with foreign affairs, foreign trade, reception of foreign dignitaries, reception ranking and protocols for Ottomans, and foreign press supervision. The second section held old Imperial Council departments handling internal affairs which itself had two departments: the Imperial Council itself: Divan-ı Hümayun Kalemi, which issued and recorded all imperial orders, treaties, letters of the sultan to foreign rulers, officials, and governments, and the sanctioning of travel within and outside the empire; and the Department of non-Muslim Religious Affairs [Mezahib-i Gayr-i Müslüm Dairesi], which was divided by millet and issued orders and communiques from not only the Foreign Ministry but from other ministries in the government. Finally there were the two "lesser" sections: the Translation Office, and the Archives Department, which developed into a general archives of the entire Porte.

According to the Corps de droit Ottoman, it was headed by a minister representing the Réis Effendi and a six-member council with sub-secretary of state (mustéchar) leading it. Other major figures included the Grand Master of Ceremonies of the head of the Drogmanat of the Imperial Divan and the Grand Master of Ceremonies (Techrifati-Hardjié) directed by the Introducer of Ambassadors. Its departments included:

- Accounting (Direction de Comptabilité)
- Chamber of Jurists (Bab-i-ali Istikharé Odassi, Chambre des Conseillers légistes)
- Commercial Affairs (Tidjarié, Direction des Affaires Commerciales)
- Consulates (Chehpendéri, Direction des Consulats)
- Foreign Correspondence (Tahrirat-i-Hardjié, Direction de la Correspondance étrangère)
- Foreign Press (Direction de la presse étrangère)
- Litigation (Oumori-Houkoukié-i-Muhtélita, Direction du Contentieux)
- Nationalities (Direction des Nationalités)
- Personnel (Sigilli Ahwal, Direction du Personnel)
- Translation (Terdjumé, Direction de Traduction)
- Turkish Correspondence (Mektoubi-Hardjié, Direction de la Correspondance turque)

== List of ministers ==
- Akif Pasha (1836)
- Ahmed Hulusi Pasha (1836-1837)
- Mustafa Reshid Pasha (1837-1838)
- Mehmed Nuri Efendi (1838-1839)
- Mustafa Reshid Pasha (1839-1841)
- Sadık Rıfat Pasha (1841)
- Ibrahim Sarim Pasha (1841-1843)
- Sadık Rıfat Pasha (1843-1844)
- Mehmed Shekib Efendi (1844)
- Mehmed Emin Âli Pasha (1844-1845)
- Mustafa Reshid Pasha (1845-1846)
- Mehmed Emin Âli Pasha (1846-1848)
- Sadık Rıfat Pasha (1848-1848)
- Mehmed Emin Âli Pasha (1848-1852)
- Keçecizade Fuad Pasha (1852-1853)
- Sadık Rıfat Pasha (1853)
- Mustafa Reshid Pasha (1853-1854)
- Mehmed Emin Âli Pasha (1854)
- Mehmed Esad Safvet Efendi (1854-1855) substitute minister
- Keçecizade Fuad Pasha (1855-1856)
- Mehmed Emin Âli Pasha (1856)
- İbrahim Edhem Pasha (1856-1857)
- Ali Galib Pasha (1857)
- Mehmed Emin Âli Pasha (1857)
- Keçecizade Fuad Pasha (1857-1858)
- Mahmud Nedim Pasha (1858-1860) substitute minister
- Mehmed Esad Safvet Efendi (1860) substitute minister
- Mehmed Emin Âli Pasha (1860-1861)
- Keçecizade Fuad Pasha (1861)
- Mehmed Emin Âli Pasha (1861-1867)
- Keçecizade Fuad Pasha (1867-1869)
- Mehmed Esad Safvet Pasha (1869)
- Mehmed Emin Âli Pasha (1869-1871)
- Server Pasha (1871-1872)
- Mehmed Cemil Pasha (1872)
- Halil Şerif Pasha (1872-1873)
- Mehmed Esad Saffet Pasha (1873)
- Mehmed Rashid Pasha (1873-1874)
- Ahmed Arifi Pasha (1874)
- Mehmed Esad Saffet Pasha (1874-1875)
- Mehmed Rashid Pasha (1875-1876)
- Mehmed Esad Saffet Pasha (1876-1877)
- Ahmed Arifi Pasha (1877)
- Server Pasha (1877-1878)
- Mehmed Esad Saffet Pasha (1878)
- Asım Mehmed Pasha (1878)
- Alexander Karatheodori Pasha (1878-1879)
- Mehmed Esad Saffet Pasha (1879)
- Sava Pasha (1879-1880)
- Abidin Pasha (1880)
- Asım Mehmed Pasha (1880-1881)
- Said Halim Pasha (1881-1882)
- Asım Mehmed Pasha (1882)
- Mehmed Esad Saffet Pasha (1882)
- Ahmed Arifi Pasha (1882-1884)
- Asım Mehmed Pasha (1884-1885)
- Said Halim Pasha (1885-1896)
- Turhan Pasha (1896-1899)
- Said Halim Pasha (1899)
- Ahmed Tevfik Pasha (1899-1909)
- Mehmed Rifat Pasha (1909-1911)
- İbrahim Hakkı Pasha (1911)
- Mustafa Asım Bey (1911-1912)
- Gabriel Noradunkyan (1912-1913)
- Said Halim Pasha (1913-1915)
- Halil Bey (1915-1917)
- Ahmed Nesimi Bey (1917-1918)
- Mehmed Nabi Bey (1918)
- Mustafa Reshid Pasha (1918-1919)
- Yusuf Franko Pasha (1919)
- Damat Ferid Pasha (1919)
- Abdüllatif Safa Bey (1919)
- Mustafa Reshid Pasha (1919-1920)
- Abdüllatif Safa Bey (1920)
- Damat Ferid Pasha (1920)
- Abdüllatif Safa Bey (1920-1921)
- Ahmed İzzet Pasha (1921-1922)

== See also ==
- Foreign relations of the Ottoman Empire
  - Ottoman Empire-United States relations
  - Persian-Ottoman relations
