= Translation Office (Ottoman Empire) =

The Translation Office (Turkish: Tercüme Odası, also spelled Terceme Odası, or Terdjuman Odasi; French: Direction de Traduction, also rendered as Bureau des Interprètes or Cabinet des Traducteurs) was an organ of the Government of the Ottoman Empire that translated documents from one language to another.

The government created it in 1821 as the Ottoman authorities wanted to train their own corps of Turkish translators instead of using Phanariotes due to the Greek War of Independence occurring. Most of the staff at Ottoman diplomatic missions in Europe originated from this office.

Salaries and prominence of the office increased after the 1830s in the aftermath of the Battle of Konya and Treaty of Hünkâr İskelesi.

Bernard Lewis, author of The Muslim Discovery of Europe, wrote that the Translation Office became "one of the avenues to preferment and power".

The office created French-language versions of official documents. Such documents, created by the Translation Office and other Ottoman government organs dedicated to translating documents, catered to foreigners, and were used to create versions of documents in languages used by Ottoman non-Muslims.

== Notable staff ==
- Mehmed Emin Âli Pasha
- Mehmed Fuad Pasha

== See also ==
- Dragoman
- Languages of the Ottoman Empire
- Foreign relations of the Ottoman Empire
