= Amcazade Köprülü Hüseyin Pasha =

Grand Vizier of the Ottoman Empire from 1697 to 1702

- Amcazade Köprülü Hüseyin Paşa
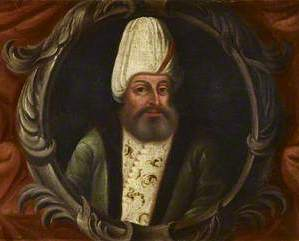

Grand Vizier of the Ottoman Empire
- In office 17 September 1697 – 4 September 1702
- Monarch: Mustafa II
- Preceded by: Elmas Mehmed Pasha
- Succeeded by: Daltaban Mustafa Pasha

Personal details
- Born: 1644
- Died: 1702 (aged 57–58)
- Relations: Köprülü Mehmed Pasha (uncle); Köprülüzade Fazıl Ahmed Pasha (cousin); Köprülüzade Fazıl Mustafa Pasha (cousin)
- Family: Köprülü family

Amcazade Köprülü Hüseyin Pasha (Turkish: Amcazade Köprülü Hüseyin Paşa, "Köprülü Hüseyin Pasha the Nephew"; in Albanian: Hysein Pashë Kypriljoti) (1644–1702) of the Köprülü family, was the grand vizier of the Ottoman Empire under Mustafa II from September 1697 until September 1702. Amcazade Koprulu Huseyin Pasha was close to ordinary Ottoman Muslim subjects being a member of the Mevlevi Order. He was known to be concerned with the needs of the common people as well as those of the military and bureaucratic classes.

== Earlier years ==
Amcazade Huseyin was born in 1644 and was the son of Hasan Ağa Kypriljoti, the brother of Köprülü Mehmed Pasha, and for this reason he has the cognonom of "amcazade (nephew)". There is little information about his youth and education. His father had agricultural estates at the Turkish village of "Kozluca" in present-day Bulgaria and young Hüseyin spent his youth there. He must have had a good Ottoman classical scribal or military education, since his first mention was as a staff officer. He participated at the campaign for Siege of Vienna in 1683, as a high staff officer in the Ottoman army commanded by the Grand Vizier Merzifonlu Kara Mustafa Pasha, who was his close relative. After the defeat of Ottomans at the Battle of Vienna and retreat to Belgrade, Merzifonlu Kara Mustafa was executed and Amcazade Huseyin was arrested because of his close relationship to the executed commander.

In 1684 he was released from prison, but was sent away from the seat of power as an administrator of provinces with a rank of beylerbey. First he was appointed as guard-governor of Cardak near Gallipoli at the Dardanelles Straits; then he was given the rank of vizier and given a similar but more prestigious job at Seddulbahir. In 1691 for a time he was appointed as the temporary governor (kaimakam of Istanbul and returned to his main job on Dardanelles. On 1694 he was appointed the Kapudan Pasha (Ottoman admiral-in-chief) and was instrumental -with the help of Mezzo Morto Huseyin Pasha- in retaking of Chios from the Venetians in 1695. For this success he was appointed the governor of Chios. In 1696 he was again appointed as the temporary governor of Istanbul but soon was sent to the post of governorship of Belgrade. In August 1697 the Ottoman army under the command of Sultan Mustafa II was on the campaign against the Austrians and came to Belgrade. In a War Council planning on what to do next, Amcazade Huseyin Pasha proposed that the Ottoman army should go and put the fortress of Varaždin under siege. However, others argued that it should go towards Temesvar; their proposal was accepted and the Ottoman army was surprised and routed at the Battle of Zenta.

His daughter married Kavanoz Ahmed Pasha, who was the grand vizier for a short time in 1703.

== Years as Grand Vizier ==
Amcazade Köprülü Hüseyin Pasha was appointed the Grand Vizier on 17 September 1697 just after the Ottoman defeat at the Battle of Zenta on 11 September 1697. He was given a promise by the Sultan that he would be free agent in his government of the Empire with no interference by the Sultan. It was hoped that during the negotiations for peace to take place at Karlowitz, he could use family ability to get best possible terms for the ending of the long war against the Holy League of 1684, a coalition of European powers including the Habsburg monarchy, the Polish–Lithuanian Commonwealth, the Republic of Venice and Peter I of Russia. After long months of negotiations the Treaty of Karlowitz was signed on 26 January 1699. The Ottomans ceded to the Habsburg Monarchy, all of the Ottoman province of Hungary including Transylvania which was conquered after 1526; Podolia was returned to Poland and most of Dalmatia and Morea (the Peloponnese peninsula in southern Greece) were passed to Venice. With the heavy loss of elite soldiers at the Battle of Zenta and the large territories ceded away, it became obvious that Ottoman military system, the financial system and bureaucratic systems sustaining the military and the state had to be reformed. This task fell mainly on the shoulders of the Grand Vizier Amcazade Köprülü Hüseyin Pasha.

Amcazade Huseyin started with economic and financial reforms. The excise duties on tobacco and coffee, which had quadrupled during the war to provide finance for military effort, were substantially reduced and so too the duties on essential consumer goods, for example soap and cooking oil. During the war special imposition taxes were created and those who could not pay these extraordinary tax impositions were heavily fined. Amcazade Huseyin abolished these extraordinary tax impositions and issued a tax amnesty on those who were not able to pay and who were required to pay heavy fines. The rates of traditional taxes were adjusted down so that they matched the ability to pay. Debased coins struck during the war were replaced by coins of full value. New cultivators, from nomadic Turcomans, were induced to settle in places like Urfa, Malatya, Antalya and Cyprus where the numbers of agricultural peasants had decreased to very low levels. Efforts were made to develop a new manufacturing base, in place of devastated Ottoman craft industries and replacing imports from Europe.

Amcazade Huseyin, then, had the salary rolls of the professional army (kapıkulu corps) reviewed. The Janissaries, who had reached 70.000 men before Treaty of Karlowitz, of which only 10.000 were actually combatants, were reduced to 34,000 combatants; while the Artillery Corps were reduced from 6,000 to 1,250. There was new recruitment to the Kapıkulu Sipahi Corps. Similarly, the provincial timariot sipahis were reformed by eliminating bribery and making sure that they were properly maintained and trained.

The Navy was also reorganised under the command of Mezzo Morto Hüseyin Pasha, who was a close ally of Amcazade Huseyin. At last, a new fleet of wind-driven galleons replaced the oar-driven galleys. The naval officers and personnel were also fully reorganised creating a complete hierarchy of officers. The lower rank galleon men were properly and regularly housed in barracks; paid well and even their retirement was thought of for the first time in Ottoman navy. Finally, the bureaucracy of scribes of the central government and of the palace was reorganised, retiring old inefficient scribes and introducing new ones trained at new scribal schools.

The Sultan was very much affected by the defeat at Battle of Zenta, where he was personally present. Giving Amcazade Hüseyin a free hand in governing his realm, he retreated to a court life, not in Istanbul but in the old palace in Edirne. His close advisor was his old teacher, a cleric called Feyzullah Efendi, who he appointed as the Sheikh ul-Islam. Soon Feyzullah Efendi became the effective voice of the Sultan. As soon as the effects of Treaty of Karlowitz were over, Feyzullah Efendi collected around him a clique of relatives and allies; started appointing them to key state posts and became the centre of intrigues against the Grand Vizier Amcazade Huseyin. Feyzullah Efendi had his son Fethullah Efendi given an appointment that would give him the post of Sheik-ul-Islam when his father left the post. The appointment of a sheikh-ul-Islam by dynastic rules was totally unprecedented but Amcazade Huseyin had little choice in the matter. From then onwards whenever the state under Amcazade Huseyin started affecting adversely his interests, Feyzullah Efendi was able to intervene and stop the application of such a policy. In July 1701 Mezzo Morto Huseyin Pasha, who was an ally of Amcazade Huseyin, died and the delicate power balance between Istanbul and Edirne tipped towards Feyzullah Efendi in Edirne. This frustrated Amcazade Huseyin Pasha so much, that his serious illness is attributed to this helplessness. In September 1702 Amcazade Huseyin Pasha resigned from the post of Grand-Vizier due to his illness.

He went to live in his estate at Silivri, near Istanbul. Before the end of the year he died at his estate. He was buried at a türbe (tomb) at the district of "Sarachanebasi" in Istanbul.

As an able administrator and an important reformer he demonstrated again the ability of a member of the Koprulu dynasty in holding the Ottoman power intact after a big crisis, but at the end he was driven from office by a powerful cleric.

One of the oldest wooden coastal mansions on the Bosphorous near the first suspension bridge, is the partial remains of a Yalı belonging to him is called the "Koprulu Amcazade Huseyin Yalisi". It is claimed that Amcazade Huseyin reviewed the final negotiated copy of the Treaty of Karlowitz at this left-over part of the mansion.

== See also ==
- Köprülü Era
- Treaty of Karlowitz
- List of Ottoman grand viziers

Political offices
Preceded by Elmas Mehmed Pasha	Grand Vizier of the Ottoman Empire; 17 September 1697 – 4 September 1702	Succeeded by Daltaban Mustafa Pasha
