= Daltaban Mustafa Pasha =

Grand Vizier of the Ottoman Empire from 1702 to 1703

Grand Vizier of the Ottoman Empire
- In office 4 September 1702 – 24 January 1703
- Monarch: Mustafa II
- Preceded by: Köprülü Amcazade Hacı Hüseyin Pasha
- Succeeded by: Rami Mehmed Pasha

Personal details
- Born: Bitola, Ottoman Empire (modern day North Macedonia)
- Died: 27 January 1703 Constantinople, Ottoman Empire (modern day Turkey)

Military service
- Allegiance: Ottoman Empire
- Branch/service: Ottoman Army

Daltaban Mustafa Pasha was an Ottoman statesman who served as Grand Vizier for four months and twenty days from 4 September 1702 until 24 January 1703.

== Biography ==
He was born in Bitola and was of Serbian origin according to Joseph von Hammer (Daltaban = Barefoot). He grew up in the inner mehter of Kara Ibrahim Pasha. When Kara Ibrahim Pasha was the Grand Vizier in 1684, he was a member of the Imperial Council. He was then appointed as djebedji and in 1691 became Agha of the Janissaries.

He was promoted to Vizier and appointed to the Babadağ guard. He was appointed to the governorship of the Anatolia Eyalet in 1695, and in 1696, to the Diyarbakır Eyalet. During his campaign in Austria, he was dismissed from his Vizier position in Sofia because of complaints about his atrocities and exiled to Počitelj, Bosnia. Upon the increase of the enemy attack on Bosnia, in 1697, his Vizier status was returned and he was appointed to the Serasker of the Bosnian Front. He repelled the enemy by succeeding in Bosnia. In 1698, he was appointed to the governorship of Raqqa. In 1699, he was assigned to the Baghdad Governorate. He took back Basra and Kurna from the rebel forces and eliminated them. Upon these achievements, he was brought back to the Anatolian Governorship.

On 27 September 1702, he replaced Amcazade Köprülü Hüseyin Pasha, who left his job due to his illness. Daltaban Mustafa Pasha was appointed as the Grand Vizier with the advice of Shaykh al-Islām Feyzullah Efendi who was Sultan Mustafa II's tutor.

Daltaban Mustafa Pasha had understood that he should fulfill the demands of Feyzullah Efendi to continue this task. Sultan Mustafa II already refused to accept his presenting Grand Vizier and divan calls and irregularities without being interviewed by the Shaykh al-Islām. He wanted each of the policies of the state and the government to implement Feyzullah Efendi's opinions and ideas for each activity he would demonstrate.

Although Daltaban Mustafa Pasha is determined to go on Feyzullah Efendi's path, as he is determined to go; he was not liked by the state officials because he was a countryman and did not understand the movements and behaviors of the Istanbulites and was rough and harsh. Even the Sultan had begun to be uneasy with this rude, harsh attitude. For example, when Fethullah, the son of Feyzullah Efendi, came to the Pasha Gate, which was the workplace of the Grand Vizier, they would have taken him in front of the door; When Feyzullah came to the front of the car in front of the door to the passenger, the car began to go up. Until then, according to the committees of service, Shaykh al-Islām would go on the left side of the Grand Vizier to show that he was at a lower rank; but Daltaban Mustafa Pasha began to go on the left side of Feyzullah Efendi and concluded that the Grand Vizier was at a lower rank.

On the other hand, Reis ül-Küttab Rami Mehmet Pasha, who wished to be the Grand Vizier, had been working against Grand Vizier. He spread a rumor that the Grand Vizier wanted to work independently from Shaykh al-Islām and that he was trying to get support from the Janissaries and the Crimeans. Feyzullah Efendi, a control freak, was adversely affected. With the signing of Treaty of Karlowitz; The Crimeans were forbidden to carry out the plundering strikes in Russia and the Russians were also prohibited from establishing fortifications in these borders. The Crimeans were observing that the Russians built fortifications; they had sent the news to Istanbul, but the Ottoman state decided not to do anything about this treaty violation. The Crimeans, in turn, wanted to attack the Russian border regions. The previous Grand Vizier had not accepted this, but Daltaban Mustafa Pasha was more open to the demands of the Crimeans. And he was more tolerant of the rebellious attitude of The Khan of Crimea Devlet II Giray. For this reason, he was acting slowly in executing of Sultan's orders through Feyzullah Efendi to suppress the rebellion of Devlet II Giray. This behavior was considered an example of the independent movement of Daltaban Mustafa Pasha for Rami Mehmet Pasha and Feyzullah Efendi. Feyzullah Efendi convinced the Sultan about the dismissal of Daltaban Mustafa Pasha.

Daltaban Mustafa Pasha was dismissed from his post on 24 January 1703 for the crime of provoking the Crimean Khan against the Sultan. He was killed three days later.

== Evaluation ==
Daltaban Mustafa Pasha had been successful when he was a governor and a military officer. His execution, negatively affected the military class, in particular the kapıkulu soldiers.

Daltaban Mustafa Pasha's accent was inaccurate and he had special expressions in the language he used. Rami Mehmet Pasha ridiculed it by creating a dictionary and it is reported to have been called "Islahhat-ı Daltaniye". His mouth was broken and his language used was also toxic, rude, and harsh. His treatment of others was often violent and heartbreaking.

Daltaban Mustafa Pasha started to implement new rules for the clothes worn by the viziers during the days of the divan. To show that the viziers were separate from the other state officials on the divan, a rule was put on them to wear a turban called "kallavi" instead of another style of turban, called "mücevveze" which they had traditionally worn for hundreds of years.

"Zubdet Country Vekayı" is generally 500 pouches per year for the special administration, pen, and secretariat of the Grand Vizier; While Daltaban Mustafa Pasha was the Grand Vizier, he stated that the will he gathered for other bureaucratic treatments in reassignment, reassignment, and job change had reached 1,200 bags per year.

== See also ==
- List of Ottoman grand viziers

Political offices
Preceded by Köprülü Amcazade Hacı Hüseyin Pasha	Grand Vizier of the Ottoman Empire; 4 September 1702 – 24 January 1703	Succeeded by Rami Mehmed Pasha
