= Rami Mehmed Pasha =

Grand Vizier of the Ottoman Empire (1703)

Grand Vizier of the Ottoman Empire
- In office January 25, 1703 – August 22, 1703
- Monarch: Mustafa II
- Preceded by: Daltaban Mustafa Pasha
- Succeeded by: Kavanoz Ahmed Pasha

Ottoman Governor of Egypt
- In office 1704–1706
- Preceded by: Baltacı Süleyman Pasha
- Succeeded by: Dellak Ali Pasha

Personal details
- Born: 1645 Constantinople, Ottoman Empire
- Died: 1706 (aged 60–61) Rhodes, Ottoman Empire

Rami Mehmed Pasha (1645–1706) was an Ottoman statesman and poet who served as Grand Vizier (1703) and governor of Cyprus and of Egypt (1704–06). He was known as a poet of divan literature (the epithet Rami, meaning "Obedient", is his pen name in his poems).

== Early years ==
He was born in 1645 in Constantinople to Terazici Hasan Aga. After completing his education, he started his career as a bureaucrat. In 1690, he was appointed as a clerk in the office of the reis ül-küttab. In 1696, he was promoted to be the reis ül-küttab (a post roughly equivalent to foreign minister) and three years later he represented the Ottoman Empire in the peace talks of the Treaty of Karlowitz which ended the War of the Holy League. The Ottoman Empire was defeated in the war, but Mehmed Rami tried his best to minimize the losses.

== As a grand vizier ==
On January 25, 1703, he was promoted to the post of Grand Vizier, the highest post of the Ottoman Empire other than that of the Sultan. However he soon realized that the Sheikh ul-Islam Feyzullah, who wielded great influence on the sultan Mustafa II, was the de facto ruler of the empire. The Sultan gave strict orders to Rami Mehmed to seek Feyzullah's approval in all of his decisions, a regulation which reduced the status of the Grand Vizier to a subordinate of the Sheikh ul-Islam. Even under this unfavorable situation, Rami tried to reform the post-war economy and the navy, but his term was too short to carry these reforms through.

Both Feyzullah's almost unlimited authority and the Sultan's insistence on residing in Edirne rather than Constantinople, the capital, caused reactions among the soldiers and the citizens in Constantinople. In the summer of 1703, they revolted against the Sultan. At the end of this revolt known as Edirne event, Rami Mehmed as well as the Sultan were deposed on August 22, 1703.

== Death ==
Rami Mehmed was then appointed as the governor of Cyprus and then Egypt, but in 1706 he was exiled to Rhodes island (now a part of Greece), where he died.

== As a man of letters ==
He was poet and a friend of the famous Ottoman poet of Nabi. He also wrote about his diplomatic career. His book named Karlofça Sulhnamesi is about the talks during the Treaty of Karlowitz.

== Legacy ==
A suburb of modern Istanbul, which was once a farm owned by Rami Mehmed, is now named Rami after him.

== See also ==
- List of Ottoman grand viziers
- List of Ottoman governors of Egypt

Political offices
| Preceded by Daltaban Mustafa Pasha | Grand Vizier of the Ottoman Empire; January 25, 1703 – August 22, 1703 | Succeeded by Kavanoz Ahmed Pasha |
| Preceded by Baltacı Süleyman Pasha | Ottoman Governor of Egypt; 1704–1706 | Succeeded by Dellak Ali Pasha |
