= Gabriel Noradoungian =

Ottoman Armenian bureaucrat (1852 - 1936)

Gabriel Noradunkyan Efendi
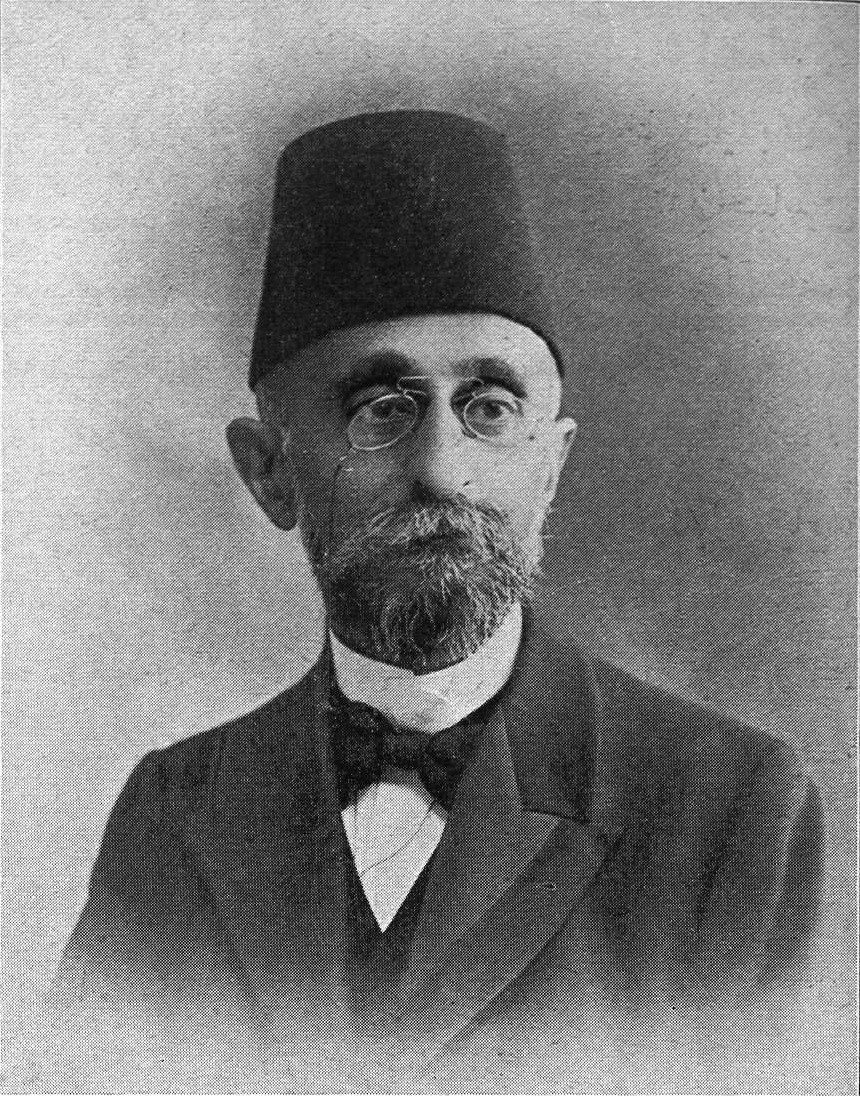

Ottoman Minister of Trade
- In office August 1908 – January 1910
- Monarchs: Abdul Hamid II; Mehmed V
- Preceded by: Naum Nimetullah Pasha
- Succeeded by: Hulusi Bey

Ottoman Minister of Foreign Affairs
- In office 22 July 1912 – 23 January 1913
- Preceded by: Mustafa Asım Turgut
- Succeeded by: Said Halim Pasha

Personal details
- Born: 6 November 1852 Constantinople, Ottoman Empire
- Died: 1936 (aged 83–84) Paris, France
- Education: Sorbonne University

Gabriel (Kapriel) Efendi Noradunkyan (Armenian: Գաբրիել Նորատունկեան, Turkish: Gabriyel Noradunkyan Efendi; 6 November 1852 Constantinople - 1936 Paris) was an Ottoman Armenian statesman and bureaucrat. He served as the Minister of Trade in 1908 and Minister of Foreign Affairs of the Ottoman Empire from July 22, 1912 to January 23, 1913 during the reign of Mehmed V and the prime ministership of Ahmed Muhtar Pasha and Kâmil Pasha.

== Life and career ==
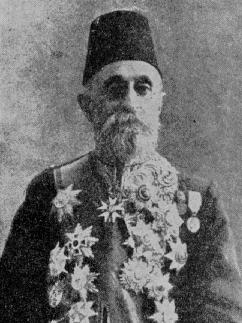
Gabriel Noradunkyan wearing a diplomatic uniform

Gabriel Noradunkyan was born in the Selamsız neighborhood of the Üsküdar district of Constantinople on 6 November 1852. He was the son of Krikor Noradunkyan, a local bread maker to the Imperial Palace. His family originated from the village of Agn (today Kemaliye) near Erzincan. Having received his elementary education at home, Gabriel Noradunkyan attended the local St. Joseph's French High School in the Kadıköy district where he graduated from in 1869.

In 1870, after graduating from Saint Joseph University, Noradunkyan continued his education in Law and Political Science at Sorbonne University in Paris. While in Paris, Noradunkyan also studied at the Collège de France and furthered his studies in Political Science at the Ecole des Sciences Politiques. He returned to Istanbul in 1875 and became a professor of law at the Mekteb-i Hukuk-ı Şahane. He was then appointed by Mahmud Nedim Pasha to be secretary at the Ministry of Foreign Affairs. In 1877, he served as a negotiator within the commissions established by the Ottoman and Russian governments during and after the Russo-Turkish War (1877–78).

In 1883, Noradunkyan became a legal consultant to the Minister of Foreign Affairs. He would remain in this post for twenty-nine years.

An active member of the Armenian community, he became the chairman of the Armenian National Assembly in 1894.

Noradunkyan published the Recueil d'actes internationaux de l'empire Ottoman, a four volume compilation of Ottoman treaties with neighboring European countries translated into French.

After the Young Turk Revolution in August 1908, Noradunkyan was appointed at the Minister of Trade. Meanwhile, in December of that year, he was elected as a member of the newly formed Senate of the Ottoman Empire. Noradunkyan served his post as Minister of Trade until January 1910.

Nordaunkyan then became the Minister of Foreign Affairs of Ottoman Empire from July 22, 1912 to January 23, 1913 during the reign of Mehmed V and the prime ministership of Ahmed Muhtar Pasha and Kâmil Pasha.

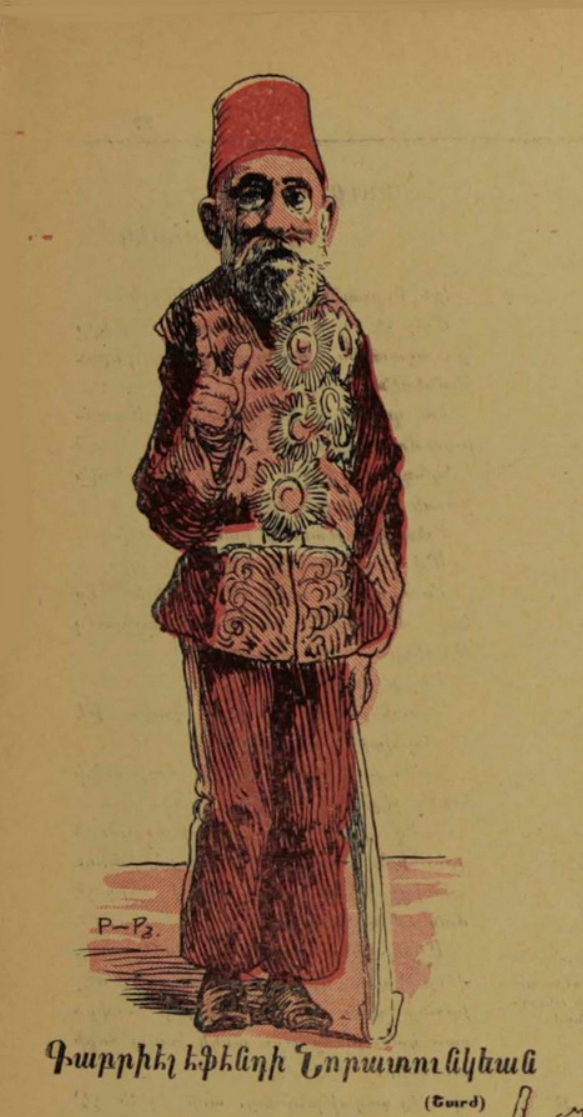
Cartoon of Gabriel Efendi Noradunkyan published in Tbilisi-based Armenian satirical periodical Khatabala after his resignation

He moved to Europe in 1915 and he was the head of the Armenian National Committee representing the Armenians in Lausanne. After moving to Europe, Gabriel Noradunkyan's properties in Istanbul were confiscated.

Noradunkyan was an ardent supporter of the establishment of an independent Armenian state in Anatolia. After the Treaty of Lausanne was signed, he moved to Paris, France where he was the head of a variety of Armenian aid organizations. He became the vice-president of the Armenian General Benevolent Union.

Noradunkyan died in Paris in 1936. Prior to his death, he dictated his biography, but only fragments of it has survived.

He knew Ottoman Turkish, Armenian, Italian, French, and English.

Political offices
Preceded by Naum Nimetullah Paşa	Minister of Trade; August 1908 – January 1910	Succeeded by Hulusi Bey
Preceded by Mustafa Asım Turgut	Ottoman Minister of Foreign Affairs; 22 July 1912 – 23 January 1913	Succeeded by Said Halim Pasha
