= List of diplomatic missions of the Ottoman Empire =

The Ottoman Empire's embassies were first established in the 1830s.

In 1870 the first permanent Ottoman diplomatic mission opened in London. The Ottoman Empire began classifying missions as great embassies, as legations/first class embassies, second class embassies, and third class embassies, beginning in 1886.

== Europe ==
- Austria-Hungary
  - Vienna – Classified as a "great" embassy
- Belgium
  - Brussels – Classified as a third class embassy
- Denmark
  - Copenhagen – Opened in 1917
- France
  - Paris – Classified as a "great" embassy
- Germany
  - Berlin – The legation began in 1837 with embassy status in 1874
- Greece
  - Athens – Classified as a "legation" or a "first class embassy"
- Italy
  - Rome – A single embassy for Italy was established upon the Unification of Italy
- Montenegro
  - Çetine – Classified as a third class embassy, opened in 1880
- Kingdom of Romania
  - Bucharest – Classified as a "legation" or a "first class embassy", opened in 1878
- Russian Empire
  - Saint Petersburg – The legation opened in 1857 with embassy status in 1873
- Kingdom of Sardinia
  - Turin – Closed upon the unification of Italy
- Serbia
  - Belgrade – Opened in 1879
- Kingdom of Sicily
  - Palermo – Closed upon the unification of Italy
- Sweden
  - Stockholm – Opened in 1898
- Switzerland
  - Bern – Opened in 1915
- United Kingdom
  - London – Classified as a "great" embassy
- Ukrainian People's Republic
  - Kyiv – This opened in 1918 and was the last Ottoman embassy to open.

== North America ==
- United States
  - Washington, D.C. (Embassy) – Classified as a "second class embassy". The empire sent its first envoy in 1867. It was designated as an embassy in 1912. In 1917 diplomatic relations ended.
  - New York City (Consulate-General) – Established after the 1880s to monitor anti-Ottoman activity.
  - Boston (Consulate-General) – Established in 1910 so the Ottomans could surveil Armenians in the U.S.

== South America ==
- Brazil
  - Rio de Janeiro (Embassy)
  - São Paulo

== See also ==
- Ottoman Empire Ministry of Foreign Affairs
