= Reis ül-Küttab =

Senior administrative post in the Ottoman government

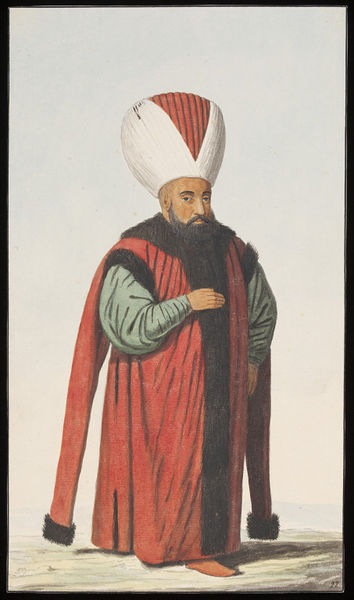
Depiction of a Reis Efendi, ca. 1809

The Reis ül-Küttab (Ottoman Turkish: رئيس الكتاب), or Reis Efendi (رئیس آفندی), was a senior post in the administration of the Ottoman Empire. Translated as "chief of the scribes" or "head clerk", the holder of the post was originally the head of the chancery of the Imperial Council, evolving into an analogue to a Foreign Minister. In 1836, the title of reis ül-küttab was formally changed to Foreign Minister (Hariciye Nazırı) with the establishment of the Ottoman Ministry of Foreign Affairs during the Tanzimat reforms.

== Establishment and evolution ==
The office is first attested in the early 1520s, and was in all likelihood a creation of Sultan Suleyman the Magnificent (r. 1520–66), although it may have existed for far longer than that as a junior post attached to the government. As its name attests—reis ül-küttab means as much as "head scribe" or "head clerk"—the post was in charge of the clerks of the Imperial Council (divan-ı hümayun), which formed the government of the Ottoman Empire.

Prior to Suleyman's reign, the functions of the office were shared by the emin-i ahkam ("depository of the decisions") and the nişancı ("chancellor"). Analogues existed however in other eastern Islamic states, as well as in Ottoman provinces, where a divan efendi presided over the council of the local governors (valis). According to J. Deny, the establishment of the reis ül-küttab was the transfer of this practice to the capital. Its establishment coincided with the gradual increase of the number of clerks attached to the various senior offices and departments of state, which began under Suleyman and continued well into the 17th century; thus for instance the seven and eleven clerks attached respectively to the defterdar ("treasurer") and the nişancı, ca. 1530, had increased to nine and 25 respectively by 1561. The first occupant of the office was probably a certain Haydar Efendi, who died in 1523/4, but the first well-known incumbent was the historian Celâlzâde Mustafa Çelebi, who held the post from 1524/5 until his promotion to nişancı in 1534.

In the 16th and 17th centuries, the reis ül-küttab was drawn from the senior secretarial staff of the viziers or, more often, and from the early 17th century almost exclusively, the Grand Vizier. A regular line of promotion (tarik) was established, whereby one advanced from ordinary secretary (Persian: khalife, Turkish: kalfa) in one of the bureaux of the Grand Vizier's secretariat to senior clerk (ser-khalife or baş-kalfa) and eventually to bureau chief (mektubcı). The latter post entailed close proximity to the Grand Vizier and was a springboard for the highest offices. On rare occasions, the person chosen as reis ül-küttab was not one of the Grand Vizier's mektubcıs, but the secretary of the Kahya Bey, the Grand Vizier's lieutenant.

== Functions ==
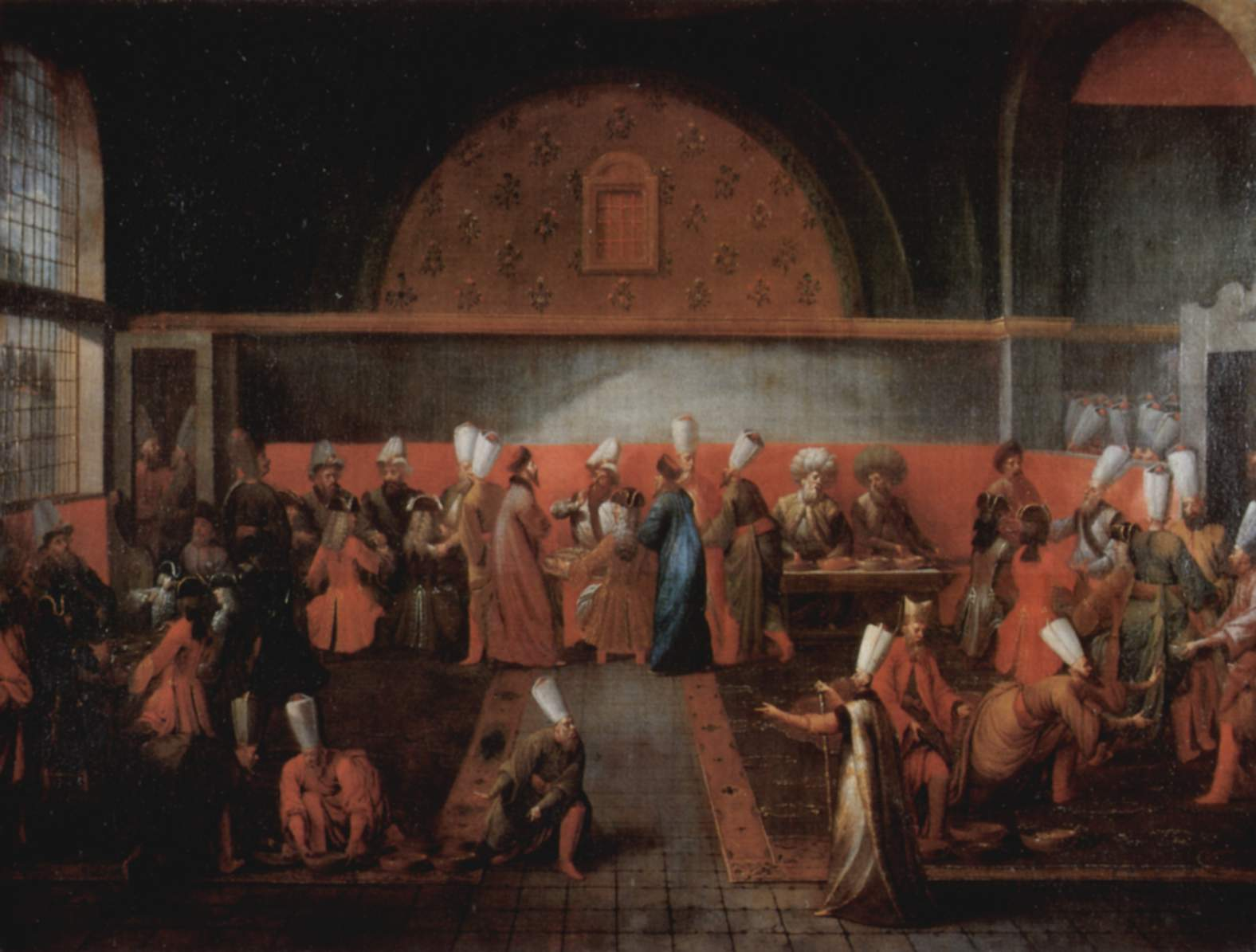
Reception of the French ambassador by the Grand Vizier and the Imperial Council in 1724

The reis ül-küttab served in close contact with the Grand Vizier, accompanying the latter to his audiences with the Sultan, as well as to the Grand Vizier's own audiences with foreign ambassadors. However, although the reis ül-küttab attended the meetings of the council, arriving before and leaving after the viziers, he had no right to speak himself in it or directly to the Sultan, and was obliged to do so via the Grand Vizier.

His main role was as the head of the Department of the Imperial Council (divan-i hümayun kalemi), which in turn was divided into three bureaux: the beylik, under the beylikçi from the mid-17th century on, which was responsible for drafting and publishing all imperial decrees (firman) or ordinances (evamir), and for keeping an archive of the originals of all laws and regulations (kanun) and treaties with other states; the tahvil, which was responsible for issuing every year the diplomas (berat) of provincial governors, judges, and timariots; the ru'us ("provisions") office, charged with provisioning various officials, as well as paying pensions from the treasury or from charitable establishments (vakıf). All state correspondence, except for military or financial matters, was in his hands.

Another subordinate official, the amedcı divan-i hümayun ("referendar of the Imperial Council"), was responsible for diplomatic correspondence and for keeping records of the memoranda (telhis) and reports (takrir) presented to the Sultan by the Grand Vizier, acting on behalf of the Imperial Council. The reis ül-küttab brought these in a special bag (kise) to meetings of the Imperial Council. There they were read by the Grand Vizier to the assembled ministers, and then taken by another special official, the telhisçi ("memorandum writer"), who presented them to the Sultan.

== Rise in importance ==
The reis ül-küttab (centre) with the Grand Dragoman (left) and the Iç Agha (right) at a reception of a European and a Bukharan diplomat

Until the early 17th century, the reis ül-küttab was junior in rank and subordinate to the nişancı, but a succession of capable reis, coupled with the inability of some of the nişancı appointees resulted in the decline of the latter and the rise of the reis to prominence. Becoming attached as a clerk to the Grand Vizier allowed the reis to break loose from the control of the nişancı, and coincided with the increasing transfer of state affairs from the Imperial Council exclusively to the purview of the Grand Vizier.

The increasing importance of foreign relations for the Ottoman Empire from this period on also played a role, as the reis was responsible for checking on the treaties archived in the beylik and certifying the answers to the requests, notes and petitions of foreign ambassadors to the Ottoman government. This process led to the reis ül-küttab gradually evolving into a de facto Foreign Minister, a role that became established after the successful conduct of negotiations for the Treaty of Karlowitz in 1699 by the then reis ül-küttab, Rami Mehmed Efendi. Nevertheless, in protocol and ceremonial, the reis ül-küttab still retained his rather junior position until the late 18th century; for instance, he was not allowed to sit in the Imperial Council chamber, but had a seat outside, the reis tahtası, and his role in court ceremonies remained limited.

It was not until Selim III's reform of the Imperial Council in 1792 that the reis ül-küttab's new role was formalized, as he became one of the ten ex officio members of the council. From then on the reis ül-küttab was formally responsible for foreign relations, a role kept until the post's abolition on 11 March 1836, along with his analogue for interior affairs, the Kahya Bey, and their replacement by two new, Western-style ministries.

== Reis ül-küttab who became Grand Viziers ==
- Rami Mehmed Pasha
- Naili Abdullah Pasha
- Koca Ragıp Pasha
- Halil Hamid Pasha
- Mehmed Said Galib Pasha

== See also ==
- Reis (military rank) – Ottoman Turkish title and naval rank
- Reis-ul-ulema – Head of a riyasat, an executive body of Balkan Muslim communities

== Sources ==
- Akyıldız, Ali (2009). "reisülküttab". In Ágoston, Gábor; Masters, Bruce (eds.). Encyclopedia of the Ottoman Empire. New York: Facts On File, Inc. pp. 486–487. ISBN 978-0-8160-6259-1.
- Deny, J. (1995). "Reʾīs ül-Küttāb". In Bosworth, C. E.; van Donzel, E.; Heinrichs, W. P. & Lecomte, G. (eds.). The Encyclopaedia of Islam, Second Edition. Volume VIII: Ned–Sam. Leiden: E. J. Brill. pp. 481–483. ISBN 978-90-04-09834-3.
- Imber, Colin (2002). The Ottoman Empire, 1300–1650: The Structure of Power (First ed.). Basingstoke: Palgrave Macmillan. ISBN 978-0-3336-1386-3.
