= Sadık Rıfat Pasha =

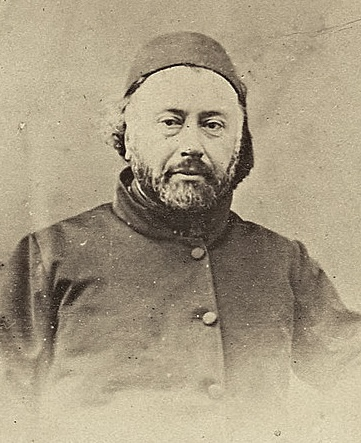

Foreign Affairs Minister of the Ottoman Empire
- In office 1841–1841
- In office 1843–1844

Personal details
- Born: Sadık Rıfat; October 25, 1807 Constantinople
- Died: February 11, 1857 (aged 49) Constantinople
- Occupation: Field marshal and statesman

Sadık Rıfat Pasha (October 25, 1807 – February 11, 1857), was an Ottoman marshal, statesman and diplomat, who was twice Foreign Affairs Minister of the Ottoman Empire.

Sadık Rifat Pasha's career was initially in line with the three statesmen of the Tanzimat era (Mustafa Reshid Pasha, Mehmed Emin Âli Pasha and Mehmed Fuad Pasha). However, the internal competition and the frequent changes of the places of Ottoman bureaucrats at the time, such as the checkers, and especially the foreign powers' intervention prevented him holding office for a longer term. He died at a relatively young age in 1857.
