= Kavanoz Ahmed Pasha =

Grand Vizier of the Ottoman Empire (1703)

Sührablı Kavanoz Nişancı Ahmed Ahmed Pasha

Grand Vizier of the Ottoman Empire
- In office 22 August 1703 – 17 November 1703
- Monarch: Ahmed III
- Preceded by: Rami Mehmed Pasha
- Succeeded by: Damat Hasan Pasha

Personal details
- Died: 12 September 1705

Kavanoz Ahmed Pasha was an Ottoman statesman who was grand vizier of Ottoman Empire under Ahmed III's rule. His tenure as grand vizier was less than three months, from 22 August to 17 November 1703.

Political offices
Preceded by Rami Mehmed Pasha	Grand Vizier of the Ottoman Empire; 22 August 1703 – 17 November 1703	Succeeded by Damat Hasan Pasha
