= Saffet Pasha =

Ottoman statesman, diplomat and reformer (1814–1883)

Mehmed Esad Saffet Pasha
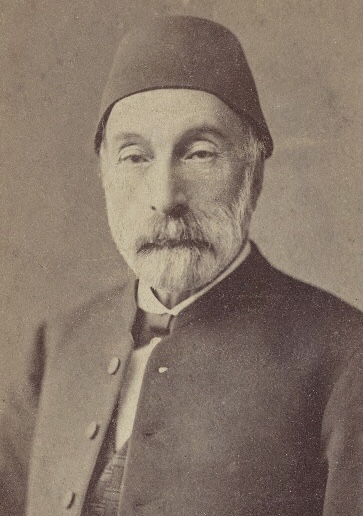

Grand Vizier of the Ottoman Empire

Personal details
- Born: 1814 Constantinople, Ottoman Empire
- Died: 1883 (aged 68–69)

Mehmed Esad Saffet Pasha, (Ottoman Turkish: محمد اسعد صفوت پاشا) also known as Saffet Pasha (1814–1883), was an Ottoman statesman, diplomat and reformer, who served as the Grand Vizier of the Ottoman Empire during the reign of Abdul Hamid II. He was a representative of the Ottoman Empire, alongside Sadullah Pasha at the Congress of Berlin.

== Biography ==
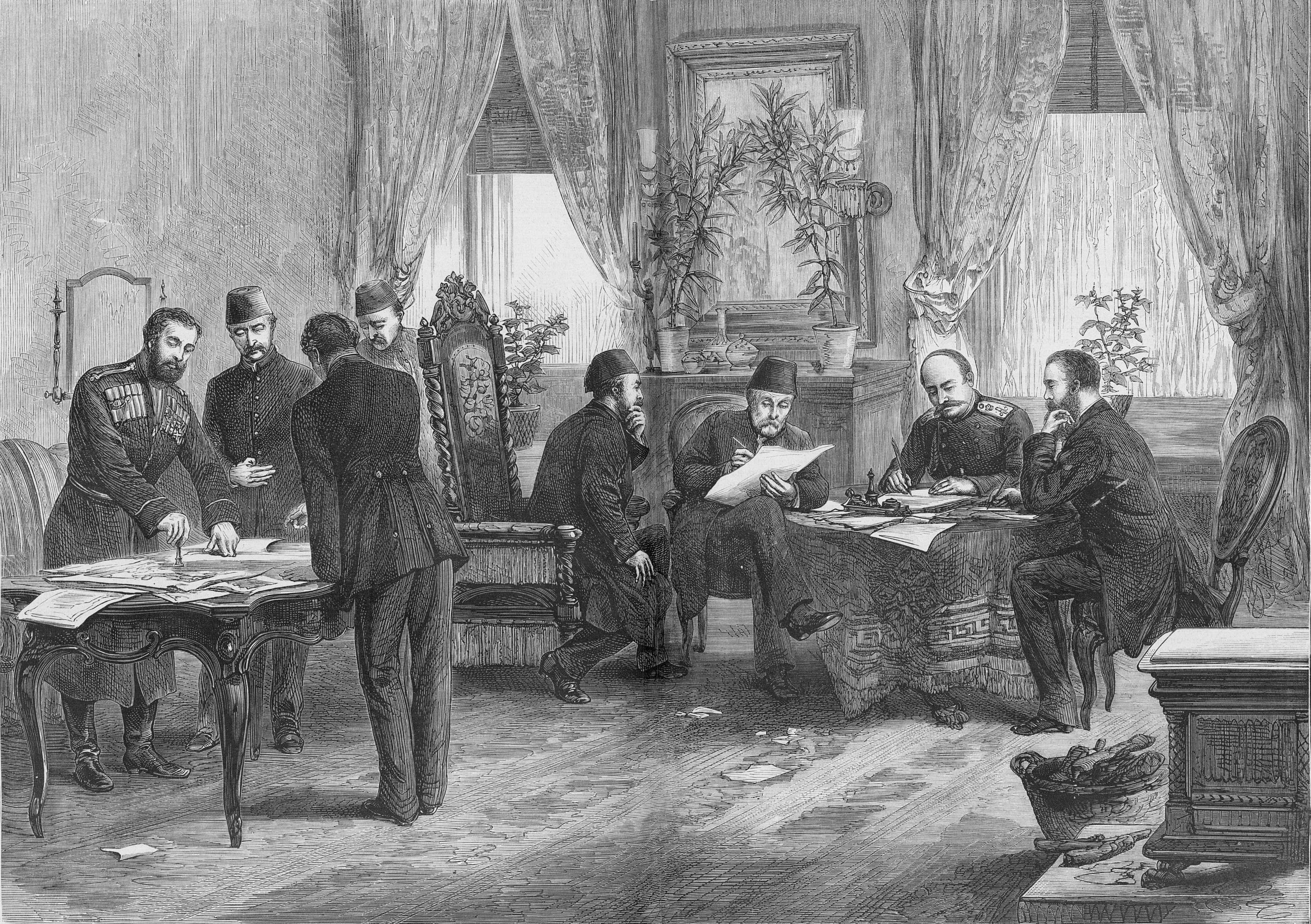
The signing of the treaty of San Stefano.

He was born in Constantinople as the son of Mehmed Hulusi Ağa who was from Sürmene. He was of Turkish origin.

He was a reformer of education during the Tanzimat period of the Ottoman Empire, as he was one of the co-founders of the prestigious Galatasaray High School. Saffet Pasha also represented the Ottoman Government at the 1876 Constantinople Conference.

== See also ==
- List of Ottoman grand viziers

Political offices
Preceded by Mehmed Rushdi Pasha	Grand Vizier of the Ottoman Empire; May 1878 – October 1878	Succeeded by Hayreddin Pasha
