= Ahmed Cevdet Pasha =

Ottoman statesman (1822–1895)

Pasha Ahmed Cevdet
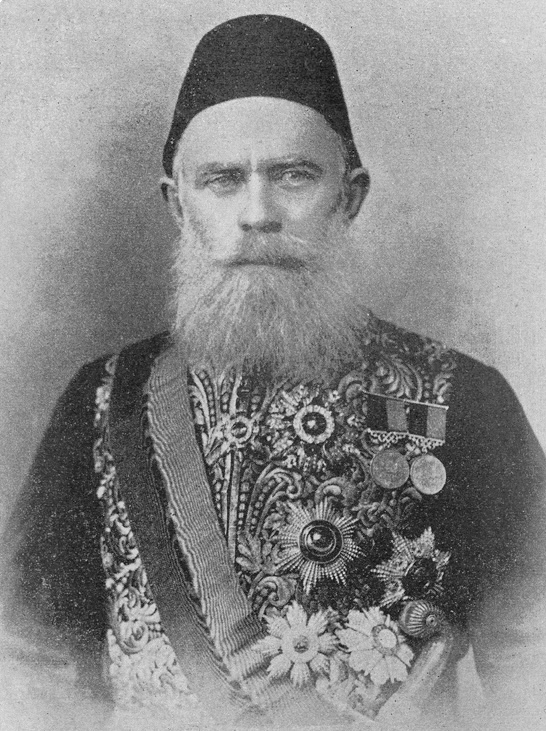

Personal life
- Born: 22 March 1822 Lofça, Ottoman Empire
- Died: 25 May 1895 (aged 73) Constantinople, Ottoman Empire
- Children: Ali Sedat; Fatma Aliye; Emine Semiye
- Notable work(s): Mecelle, Tarih-i Cevdet ("History by Cevdet Pasha")
- Occupation: Historian, statesman, sociologist, legist

Religious life
- Religion: Islam
- Denomination: Sunni
- Jurisprudence: Hanafi

Ahmed Cevdet Pasha (22 March 1822 – 25 May 1895) was an Ottoman scholar, intellectual, bureaucrat, administrator, and historian who was a prominent figure in the Tanzimat reforms of the Ottoman Empire. He was the head of the Mecelle commission that codified Islamic law for the first time in response to the Westernization of law. He is often regarded as a pioneer in the codification of a civil law based on the European legal system. The Mecelle remained intact in several modern Arab states in the early and mid-20th-century. In addition to Turkish, he was proficient in Arabic, Persian, French and Bulgarian. He wrote numerous books on history, law, grammar, linguistics, logic and astronomy.

== Early life ==
Ahmed Cevdet Pasha was born in 1822 in Lofça, Ottoman Bulgaria, to a Turkish family. He came from the notable family of Yularkiranoglu that had served the state and the faith as military, administrative, and religious officials. It was his grandfather's, Hacı Ali Efendi, wish that Ahmed pursued a career in the religious, ilmiye, ranks. Ahmed was his original name; the name "Cevdet" (Jevdet) was given to him by his tutor Süleyman Fehim Efendi in 1843.

== Education ==
Ahmed Cevdet began his education at a very early age. He started with his study of Arabic grammar from Hafız Ömer Efendi, who was the mufti of Lovech at the time. With his demonstrated rapid progress, Ahmed was soon introduced to the Islamic sciences. In 1836, he started reading with Hacı Esref Efendi, the deputy judge of Lovech who had a son that was Ahmed Cevdet's age. These two boys, who were both named Ahmed, went on to become famous as Ahmet Cevdet Pasha and Ahmed Midhat Pasha. So far, his elementary education had followed the traditional Muslim Ottoman pattern, being acquired through informal study with the local ulema.

In 1839, having finished primary school in Lofça, Ahmed's education took a more advanced turn. He moved to Istanbul, studied theology, mathematics, geology, and astronomy. He learned Arabic literature in several medreses, and received a diploma, icazet, which qualified him to serve in an Ilmiye position. Ahmed also studied Persian under Mehmed Murad Efendi (died 1848) and Süleyman Fehim Efendi, studying the divans of Orfi Shirazi and Showkat (died 1695/6). In 1844, Ahmed was granted the permission to teach the Masnavi of Rumi. Following the death of his tutor Süleyman Fehim Efendi in 1845, Ahmed completed a Turkish commentary for the Persian divan of Saib Tabrizi.

Ahmed also studied the mathematical sciences at the Imperial Military Engineering School (Hendesehâne). In addition, he developed an interest in the science of history as a study of the human experience by means of critical evaluation of the sources. He even went on to supplement his interests with studies of Islamic, French, and international law, before the age of 30.

== Career beginnings ==
After graduation, Ahmed made a contact that would fundamentally alter the rest of his career, Mustafa Reşid Pasha, who was about to enter his first term as grand vizier. Mustafa Reşid was seeking a member of the ulema that could teach him enough about Islamic religious law so that he could avoid immediate open conflict when introducing reforms. He also needed someone who was open-minded and willing to discuss problems. Ahmed Cevdet was assigned to Mustafa's house, where he tutored Mustafa and his children and stayed at this position until his patron's death in 1858. Ahmed Cevdet's new association with leaders of the Tanzimat exposed him to novel influences and ideas that drew him into the world of bureaucracy and politics. Even though Ahmed retained his connection with the ulema until 1866, he primarily functioned as a bureaucrat, taking a prominent role in education, language, and provincial reform.

In 1850–51, Mustafa Reşid appointed Cevdet as director of a school established to train teachers for the new secular school system. Ahmed also became chief scribe to the Council on Education, which would prepare new laws and regulations for the secular schools. His career as a historian began in 1852 with the Society of Knowledge. He was assigned to compile a history of the Ottoman Empire from the Treaty of Küçük Kaynarca to the destruction of the Janissary corps, so from 1774-1826. Ahmed also served as state chronicler from 1855 to 1861. Finally in 1856, he achieved his first Ilmiye position, becoming kadı (judge) of Galata, in addition to his secular duties.

== Tanzimat period ==
=== Member of the Council of the Tanzimat ===
When Mustafa Reşid rose to his sixth term as grand vizier, he made Ahmed a member of the Council of the Tanzimat. The Council was established to codify the actions sanctioned by the Tanzimat reforms. Ahmed played a prominent role in preparing laws, virtually writing the new regulations on landownership and cadastral surveys. His role as a member of Council of the Tanzimat also influenced his history projects. He abandoned the old annalistic approach for one emphasizing problems and topics, with an increasingly critical examination of the sources. Additionally, Ahmed was the principal author of the regulation that created the new Supreme Council of Judicial Ordinances, of which he became a member, in place of the Council of the Tanzimat in 1861.

Ahmed Cevdet recognized that military and administrative reforms were necessary, but being a conservative, was reluctant to use European law as an example, opting for Islamic law. His proposed answer was two-fold. The first step was to appeal to traditional values of improving education and communication. The second part involved creating conditions which would eliminate corruption and increase efficiency, while preserving the fundamental political and social concepts upon which the Ottoman Empire was based. His attempts at reconciling modernization with Islamic law are most notably present in his drafting of the Mecelle.

=== Other offices ===
In the 1860s, Ahmed Cevdet officially transferred from the Ilmiye to the Scribal Institution.

In 1861, he was sent as a special agent to Albania to suppress revolts and develop a new administrative system. It was rumored that Ahmed would become vizier then, but he was denied of this honor due to strong opposition among the ulema. They resented his enlightened and liberal interpretation of religious matters. As a result, Mehmed Fuad Pasha became vizier and Ahmed Cevdet become the inspector general in Bosnia from 1863 to 1864. There, he extended Tanzimat reforms, despite opposition from the Habsburgs and Slavic national groups. This identified him as a leading provincial troubleshooter. Living up to this role, Ahmed attempted to settle the nomadic tribes and establish order in Kozan, located in southeastern Anatolia, in 1865. Finally in 1866, his transfer to the Scribal Institution was official and he was able to accept regular administrative positions. Ahmed became governor of Aleppo Eyalet, which was formed to apply recent Tanzimat provincial reforms introduced by Fuad, the Grand Vizier.

== Notable contributions ==
=== Supreme Council of Judicial Ordinances ===
In 1868, the Supreme Council was divided into separate legislative and judicial bodies, and Ahmed was appointed chairman of the judicial branch. He subsequently became the first Minister of Justice and wrote major pieces of legislation, which established the beginnings of a secular Nizamiye court system in the Empire for the first time. In addition to this, Ahmed Cevdet led an opposition group against Mehmed Emin Ali Pasha's desire to introduce an entirely secular, French-inspired civil law for the court system. He convinced the sultan that the new civil code should be based on principles derived from Islamic law, modernized to meet the current situation. Ahmed served as chairman of the commission established to create this new law code, Mecelle.

=== Mecelle ===
The Mecelle, Islamic Code, was the new Ottoman civil law code proposed by Ahmed Cevdet Pasha for the newly established secular court system. It was based on traditional Islamic law, but also included many important modifications with the idea of updating the sharia according to the requirements of the time. It was the code that prevailed against Ali Pasha's push for the application of French Civil Law. The Mecelle combined Civil law with Islamic Law of Obligations in a final product consisting of 1,851 articles. This arduous task occupied Ahmed Cevdet until the last volume was published in 1876, for a total of about 16 years. It was the first systematic compilation incorporating both Islamic Law and Civil Law.

The Mecelle could not completely curtail the penetration of Western law in Ottoman society, but it was an important compromise to the demand for a standard law and for a fundamental change in the structure of Islamic legal system. Codification and enactment of Islamic law were essential for the proper functioning of a modern bureaucracy. The Mecelle's approach acknowledges the importance of social change and reflects the traditional attitude towards such change. For example, according to ulema, social change was acceptable unless it "contradicted the general norms." This careful consideration for upholding the general norms in order to receive the support from the ulema was seen in the articles. They primarily consisted of provisions on Law of Obligations, but also include provisions on real rights and trail procedure laws. However, the articles did not incorporate law on persons, foundations, family, or inheritance, so the Mecelle is not a true compilation of civil law. Studies were launched in 1914 in order to correct the discrepancies, but could not be completed due to World War I.

== Later years and death ==
=== Ministerial positions ===
During the last two decades of his life, Ahmed Cevdet Pasha mainly served in ministerial positions, such as education and justice. In 1873 and 1874, he became Minister of Pious Foundations and Minister of Education, respectively. He undertook major changes in the secular system of education that had been introduced. This included reforming the elementary and middle schools, establishing a new level of preparatory schools for students wishing to go on to secondary and technical schools, and expanding teacher-training schools. While all of this was happening, efforts were made to depose Abdülaziz to secure a constitution. Ahmed opposed the idea but also opposed the government of Mahmud Nedim. As a result, he was disliked by constitutionalists and sent out of Istanbul. The grand vizier occupied Ahmed by making him inspector general to Rumelia and then governor of Syria for a year. Ahmet Cevdet Pasha's relative conservatism and experience in the ulema left him inimical towards the reformers who deposed Abdülaziz and promulgated the 1876 Ottoman constitution. However, Abdulhamid II succeeded Murad V in 1876 and soon began to dismantle the newborn First Constitutional Era in favor of a return to absolute monarchy with himself holding sole power. He succeeded in this in 1878, suspending the Ottoman parliament and the constitution. Ahmed Cevdet Pasha was close to Abdulhamid, serving as Minister of Justice in 1876, Minister of the Interior in 1877, Minister of Pious Foundations in 1878, Minister of commerce in 1879, and Minister of Justice again from 1880 to 1882.

=== Death ===
Ahmed Cevdet retired from public office for a couple of years in order to educate his daughters, Fatma Aliye and Emine Semiye, and to finish his book of Ottoman history, now known as Tarih-i Cevdet ("History of Cevdet Pasha"). He also completed two other historical compilations, Tezakir ("Memoirs") and Maruzat. In 1886, he returned as Minister of Justice, but resigned four years later due to quarrels with Prime Minister (Grand Vizier) Yusuf Kamil Pasha. From that point on, Ahmed Cevdet Pasha acted as an elder statesman until his death in Constantinople on 25 May 1895. He is buried in the graveyard of the Fatih Mosque.

== Children ==
Ahmed Cevdet had three children, a son, Ali Sedat (1857–1900), and two daughters. His daughters went on to become prominent figures of late Ottoman and early Turkish history. One daughter Fatma Aliye Topuz (1862–1936) is credited as the first female writer in Turkish literature. His other daughter Emine Semiye Önasya (1864–1944) was one of the first Turkish feminists and a political activist for women in the late Empire and early Republic.

== See also ==
- Turks in Bulgaria

== Sources ==
- Özgüdenli, Osman G. (2008). "Jevdet Pasha". In Yarshater, Ehsan (ed.). Encyclopædia Iranica. Vol. XIV/6: Japan IV. Iranians in Japan–Jobbāʾi. London and New York: Routledge & Kegan Paul. pp. 639–640. ISBN 978-1-934283-07-3.
