= Tejirli =

Turkoman tribe

Tecirli

Regions with significant populations
- Turkey: Gaziantep, Kahramanmaraş, Adana

Languages
- Turkish

Religion
- Islam

Related ethnic groups
- Turkish people

Tejirli (Turkish: Tecirli, Tâcirli, or Tüccarlı) is a Turkoman tribe densely inhabiting Çukurova but also the provinces of Gaziantep, Kilis, Sivas, Kars, Erzurum in Turkey, parts of Cyprus, and Raqqa in Syria.

== Etymology ==
In Turkish and its dialects, tecir, tâcir, and tüccar translate to merchant. Thus, the tribe's name literally means with merchants, which is rooted in the tribe's predation of passing merchants. Likewise, "Tecirli hırsızı gibi" (transl. like the burglar from the Tejirli tribe) is a local Turkish phrase from Aintab.

== History ==
In its region of settlement, the tribe used to be viewed as one of the most uneducated and feared tribes. Ahmed Cevdet Pasha underlined the uneducated nature of this tribe in his works, Tezakir and Maruzat. Communities belonging to the tribe didn't often include a single imam among its ranks, and thus the tribe used to bury its dead and arrange marriages without religious supervision. They would have proper burials and marriage when an imam would be available and would later rob the imam.
