= Midhat Pasha =

Ottoman politician, reformist and statesman (1822–1883)

- مدحت پاشا
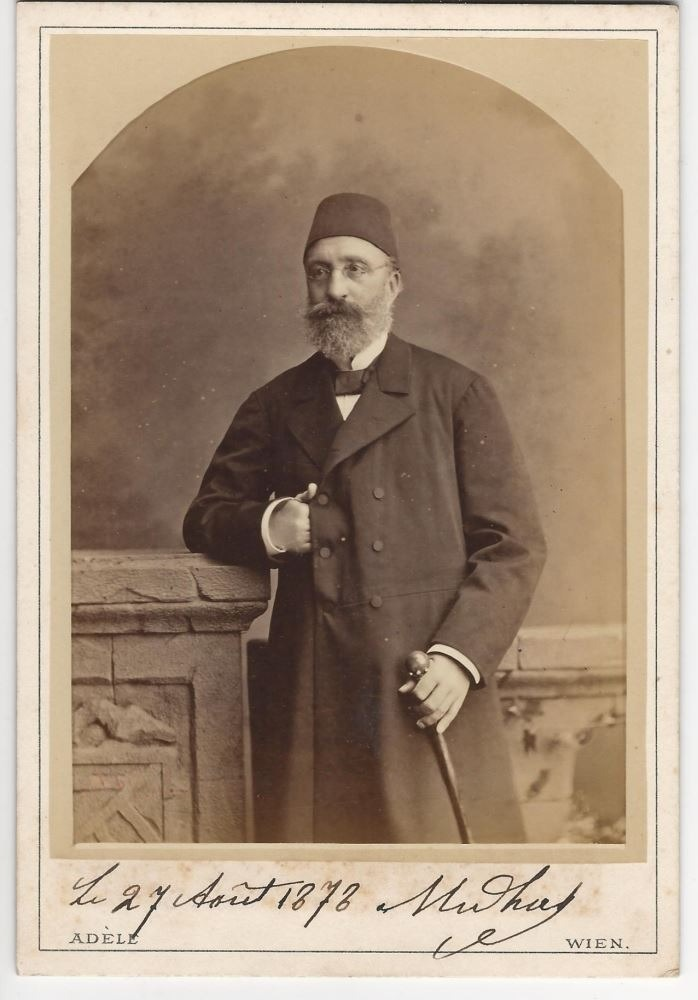
- Midhat Pasha in Vienna, July 1877

Grand Vizier of the Ottoman Empire
- In office 19 December 1876 – 5 February 1877
- Monarch: Abdulhamid II (r. 1876–1909)
- Preceded by: Mehmed Rushdi Pasha
- Succeeded by: Ibrahim Edhem Pasha
- In office 31 July 1872 – 19 October 1872
- Monarch: Abdulaziz (r. 1861–1876)
- Preceded by: Mahmud Nedim Pasha
- Succeeded by: Mehmed Rushdi Pasha

Personal details
- Born: 1822 Constantinople, Ottoman Empire
- Died: 26 April 1883 (aged 60) Taif, Hejaz Vilayet, Ottoman Empire
- Parliament: Parliament of the Ottoman Empire

Ahmed Şefik Midhat Pasha (Ottoman Turkish: احمد شفيق مدحت پاشا, romanized: Aḥmed Şefīḳ Midḥat Pāşā; 1822 – 26 April 1883) was an Ottoman politician, reformist, and statesman. He was the author of the Constitution of the Ottoman Empire.

Midhat was born in Istanbul and educated from a private medrese. In July 1872, he was appointed grand vizier by Abdulaziz (r. 1861–1876), though was removed in August. During the First Constitutional Era, in 1876, he co-founded the Ottoman Parliament. Midhat was noted as a kingmaker and leading Ottoman democrat. He was part of a governing elite which recognized the crisis the Empire was in and considered reform to be a dire need. He clashed with Sultan Abdul Hamid II (r. 1876–1909), who in 1881 had him convicted of the alleged murder of Sultan Abdulaziz. In 1883, Midhat was killed in the prison of al-Ta'if, reportedly on the Sultan's orders.

== Life ==
=== Early life and family ===
Ahmed Shefik Midhat Pasha was born in Istanbul in the Islamic month of Safar in 1238 AH, which began on 18 October 1822. His family consisted of well-established Muslim scholars. His father, Rusçuklu Mehmed Eşref, was a native of Ruse. The family seem to have been professed Bektashis. Born into an Ilmiye family, he received a private and medrese education.

He spent his youth in his parents' home in Vidin, Lovech and later Istanbul, where his father held judicial office.

=== Early political career ===
In 1836 he worked in the secretariat of the grand vizier, and in 1854 the Grand Vizier Kıbrıslı Mehmed Emin Pasha gave him the task of pacifying the province of Adrianople, and he succeeded in putting down banditry in the Balkans in 1854–1856. In 1858 he spent six months traveling in western Europe for studies, including in Vienna, Paris, Brussels and London. While he was second secretary of the Supreme Council of Judicial Ordinances, he took part in the investigation of the Kuleli Incident.

=== Governorships ===
==== Niš and Danube governorship ====
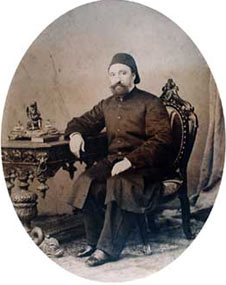
Midhat Pasha as the Governor of Danube, 1865 (photograph: Abdullah Frères).

In 1861 he was appointed governor of Niš, where he was instrumental in introducing the vilayet system in the Balkans. Fuad Pasha, in order to implement the 1864 Vilayet Law, began with a pilot program in the form of the model and experimental vilayet of the Danube, in which Midhat Pasha was appointed its first Vali. He was governor of the Danube Province from 1864 to 1868. He played a major role in the accommodation of Muslim refugees from Serbia, who were expelled by the government in 1862. During his governorship, he built countless schools and educational institutes, built hospitals, granaries, roads and bridges, paying for these projects through voluntary contributions from the people. Within two years Midhat Pasha restored order, introduced the new reformed hierarchy, provided agricultural credits (through the first agricultural credit co-operatives), extended roads, bridges, and waterways, started industries, opened schools and orphanages, founded a newspaper, and increased the revenues of the province from 26,000 to 300,000 purses. He clashed with the Grand Vizier Mehmed Emin Ali Pasha, which led to his appointment as governor of Baghdad in 1869, as the appointment to such a remote posting was intended as a punishment.

==== Baghdad governorship ====
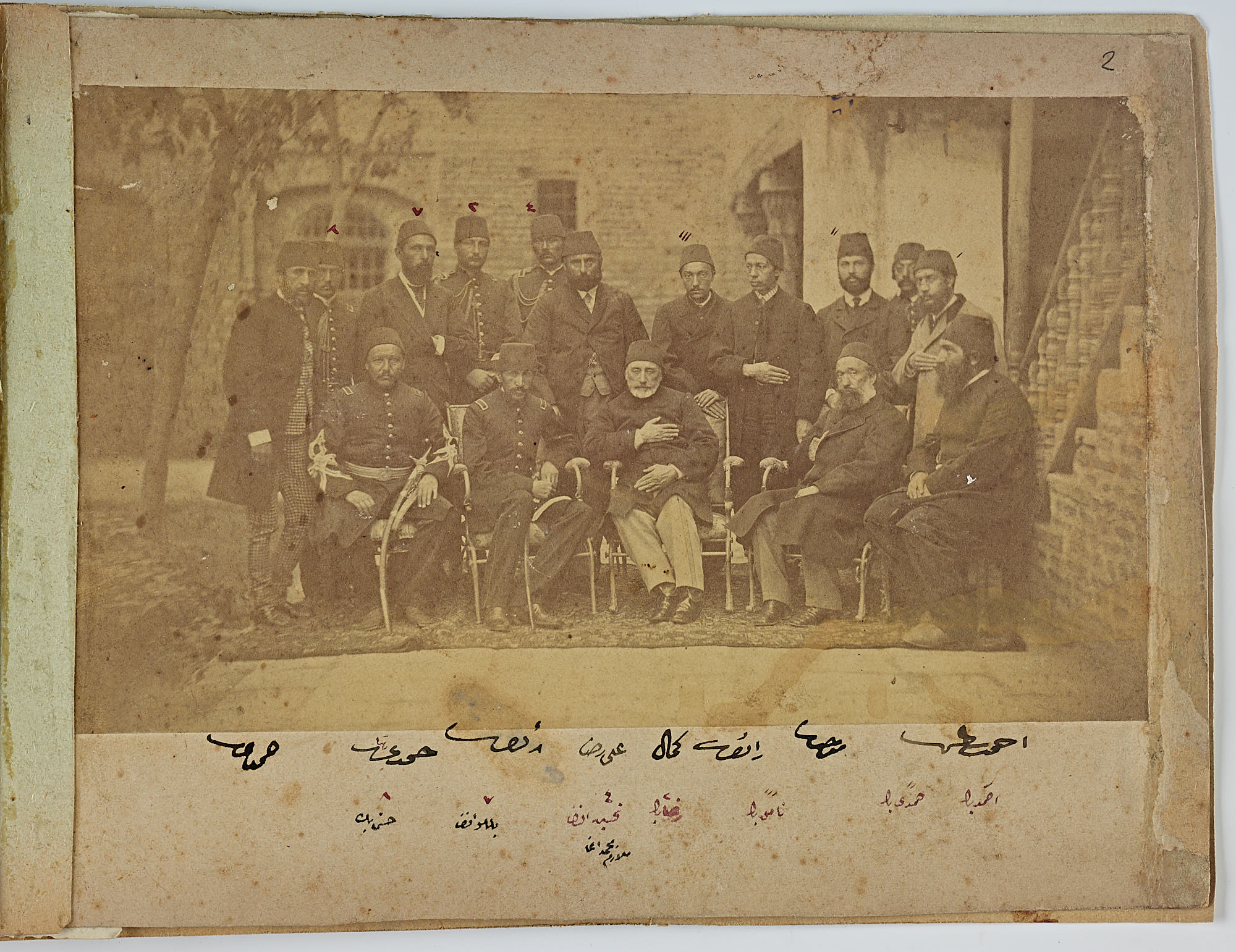
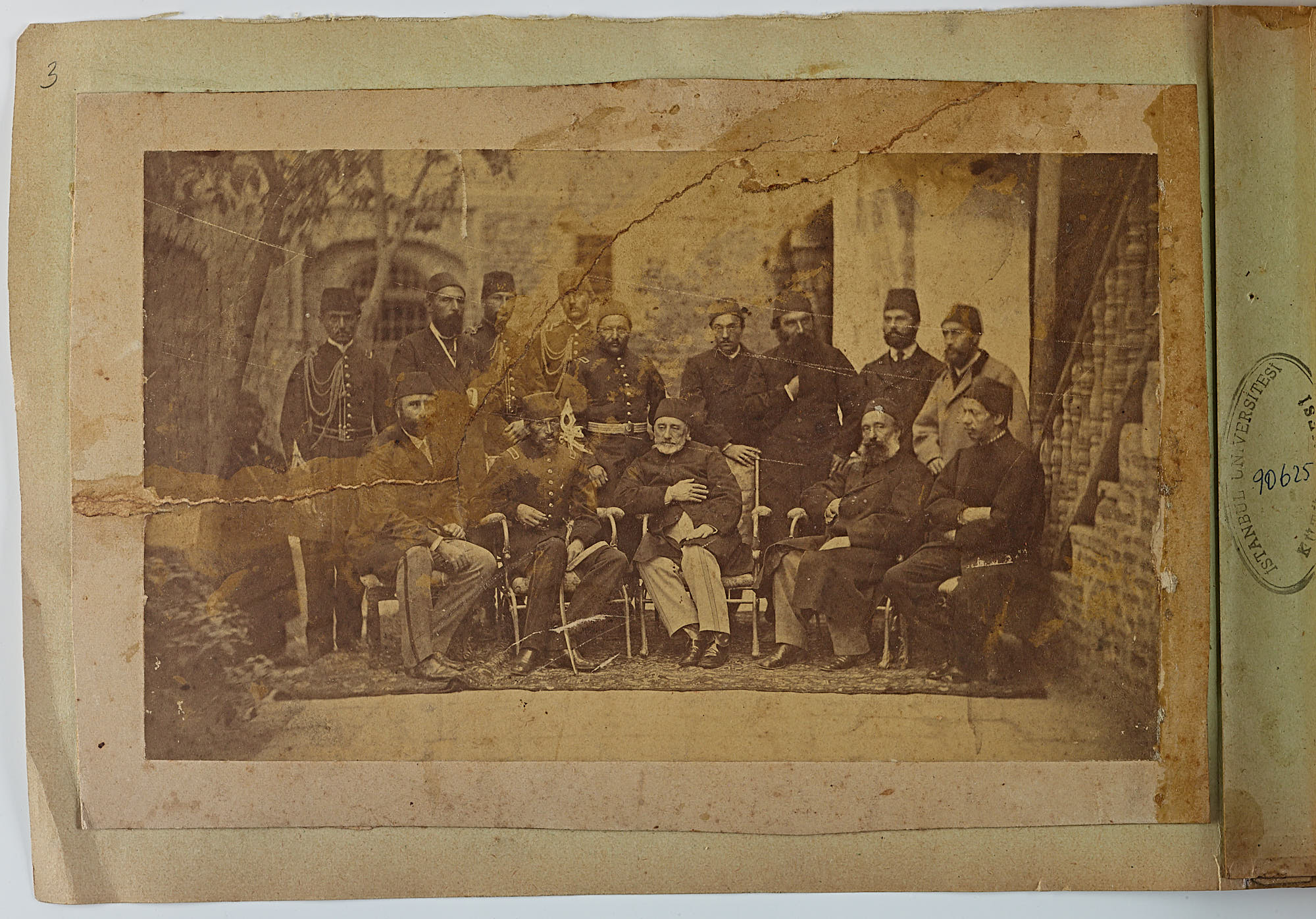
Midhat Pasha and his Erkân-i Vilâyet (Governing People of Wilayah) photographed together along with writers and intellectuals, Baghdad, 1870. Among them were several famous and famous-to-be people, like Osman Hamdi Bey.

After his arrival in Baghdad in 1869, he opened a series of government schools, as the city previously had no state educational institutions. He also emphasized reforming the Sixth Army, and to that end he opened military schools. The military schools were to have the more lasting impact: by 1900, the civil preparatory high school was attended by only 96 students, compared to 256 for the military preparatory school, and 846 for the military middle school in the same year.

He helped modernize the province, and he re-established Ottoman rule in al-Hasa. He enacted the vilayet system in Baghdad, and applied the 1858 land decree under which miri land could be granted to individuals, under a system known as nizam tapu.

As one of the modernization efforts carried out by Midhat Pasha, the newspaper al-Zawra was published bilingually (Turkish and Arabic) as the official mouthpiece of the governorate. al-Zawra is known as one of the first newspaper of Iraq, only predated by Journal Iraq, and was continued until the British takeover.

Sir Henry Dobbs recognised the three years of Midhat Pasha's governorship as the most stable and secure period of Ottoman rule in the region. He left the post in 1872, returning to Istanbul.

=== Grand Viziership ===
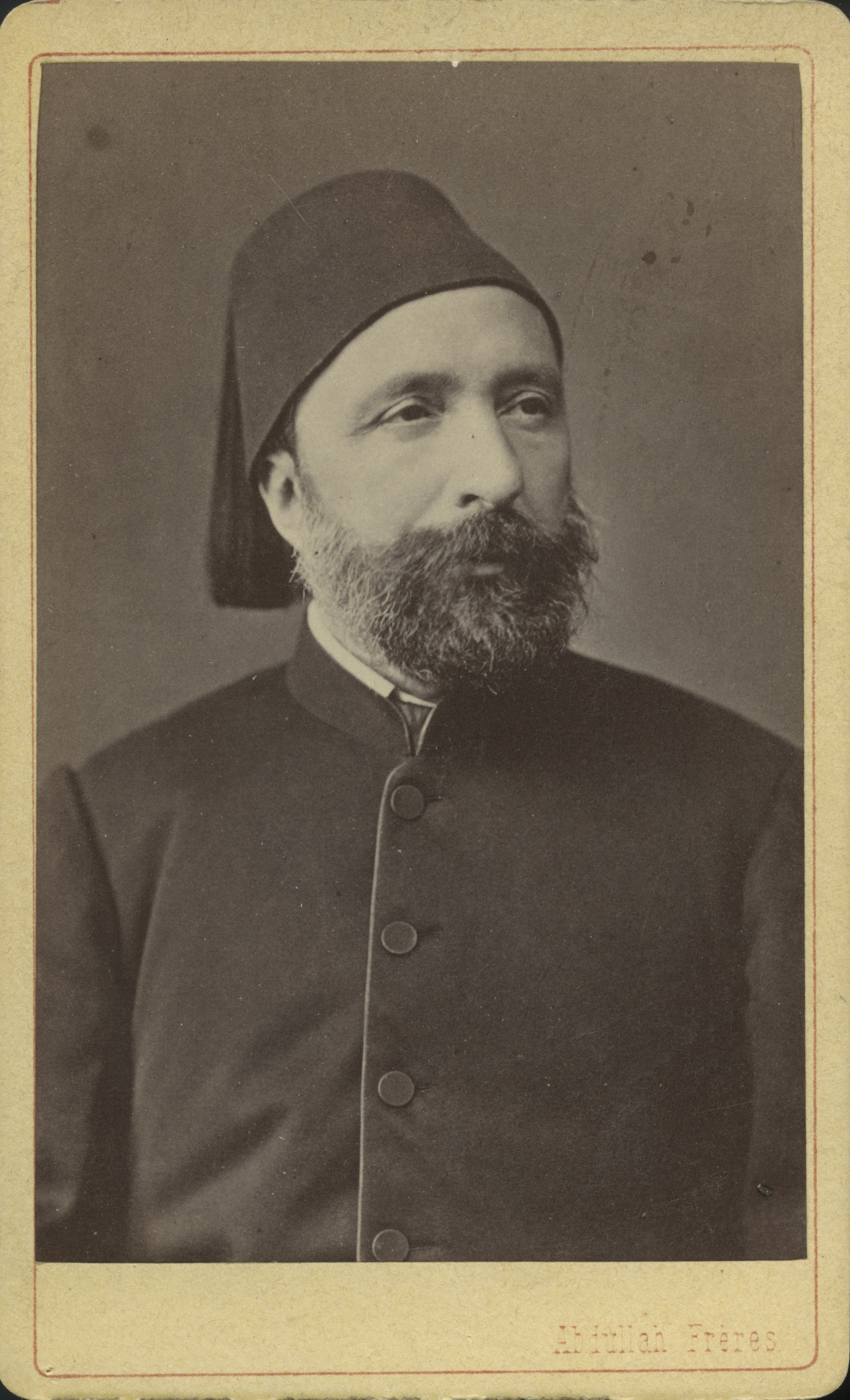
Midhat Pasha, according to the magazine S̱ervet-i Funûn (n. 1533-59, 31 December 1925), "when he was Ṣadr-i Âʿẓam" (Grand Vizier), 1872 (photograph: Abdullah frères). Midhat Pasha played a major role in the abolition of slavery in the Ottoman Empire.

In 1872, he was appointed grand vizier by Abdulaziz (r. 1861–1876). His first tenure came to an abrupt end, mainly due to his clashes with Abdulaziz over financial and economic issues. He was dismissed after two months. He also served as Minister of Justice in 1873 and 1875, but his tenure in these offices was short-lived, owing to his inclination towards a constitutional regime.

The emerging internal, financial and diplomatic crises of 1875–1876 provided him with a chance to lead the 1876 Ottoman coup d'état and introduce a constitution, beginning the First Constitutional Era which he dominated as chair of the constitutional committee.

On 15 June 1876, an Ottoman infantry officer named Çerkez Hasan assaulted a meeting in the mansion of Midhat Pasha, where all the chief ministers were present. The minister of war Huseyin Avni Pasha was shot, and the foreign minister Rashid Pasha was killed, as was one of Midhat's servants, named Ahmed Aga. In total, 5 were killed and 10 were wounded, and Hasan was sentenced to death for the crime, in an incident known as the Çerkez Hasan incident.

Midhat Pasha was again appointed Grand Vizier, in place of Mehmed Rushdi Pasha, on 19 December 1876. When he was appointed, he promised to continue on the path of reform, and announced on 23 December 1876 that a constitution would be promulgated and a representative parliament established. Though not a member of the commission that drafted the constitution, he played an important part in its adoption. The constitution guaranteed equal rights for all citizens without distinction of race or creed; the abolition of slavery; an independent judiciary based on civil (rather than religious) law; universal elementary education; and a bicameral parliament, with a Senate appointed by the Sultan and a directly elected Chamber of Deputies. Midhat Pasha asserted in the Nineteenth Century that "in Islam the principle of government rests upon bases essentially democratic, inasmuch as the sovereignty of the people is therein recognized."

Popular support for the constitution began to plummet when it became known that it was to grant equal rights for non-Muslims. The softas, which had been Midhat's supporters just months earlier, became largely opposed. Midhat Pasha managed to pressure Abdul Hamid II into approving the constitution, but the Sultan was able to include the notorious article 113, which gave him the power to banish anyone from the empire without trial or other legal procedure.

Abdul Hamid had no real interest in constitutionalism, and on 5 February 1877, he exiled Midhat Pasha. Sent to Brindisi on the imperial yacht, from there he visited France, Spain, Austria-Hungary and the United Kingdom, where he wrote memoranda supporting the Ottoman cause in the Russo-Turkish War of 1877–78, and a pamphlet defending Ottoman reforms. Midhat's popularity in Europe, coupled with British pressure, led Abdul Hamid to allow him to return from exile, and he arrived in Crete on 6 September 1878.

After the war ended, Sultan Abdul Hamid II dismissed the government and returned to despotic rule.

=== Governorship of Syria ===
The intervention of the British led to his appointing as governor again, and he became governor of the Vilayet of Syria in November 1878, a post he held until 31 August 1881. During his tenure he endeavoured to reform the province. He used a charitable association for education, which had been formed by some of Beirut's prominent Muslim citizens, into a centrepiece of his educational reform, and encouraged the formation of similar associations in Damascus and elsewhere.

He admitted many Arabs in the civil service, including in the positions of qaimaqam and mutasarrif, and gave minorities broad representation in the administration. He encouraged the development of the press, and the number of newspapers rose to more than twelve. He took an interest in the construction of roads, and in the maintenance of security. He involved local notables in the financing of local projects, such as the tramway system in Tripoli and the founding of the Beirut Chamber of Commerce. He then resigned the post, as he felt Istanbul was offering him an insufficient amount of support. His reputation in Europe was that his reforming zeal was an aberration, based on individual strength of personality. They believed Midhat Pasha could not succeed, citing the inefficient and corrupt nature of the Ottoman state, and the fractured nature of its society.

=== Imprisonment and death ===
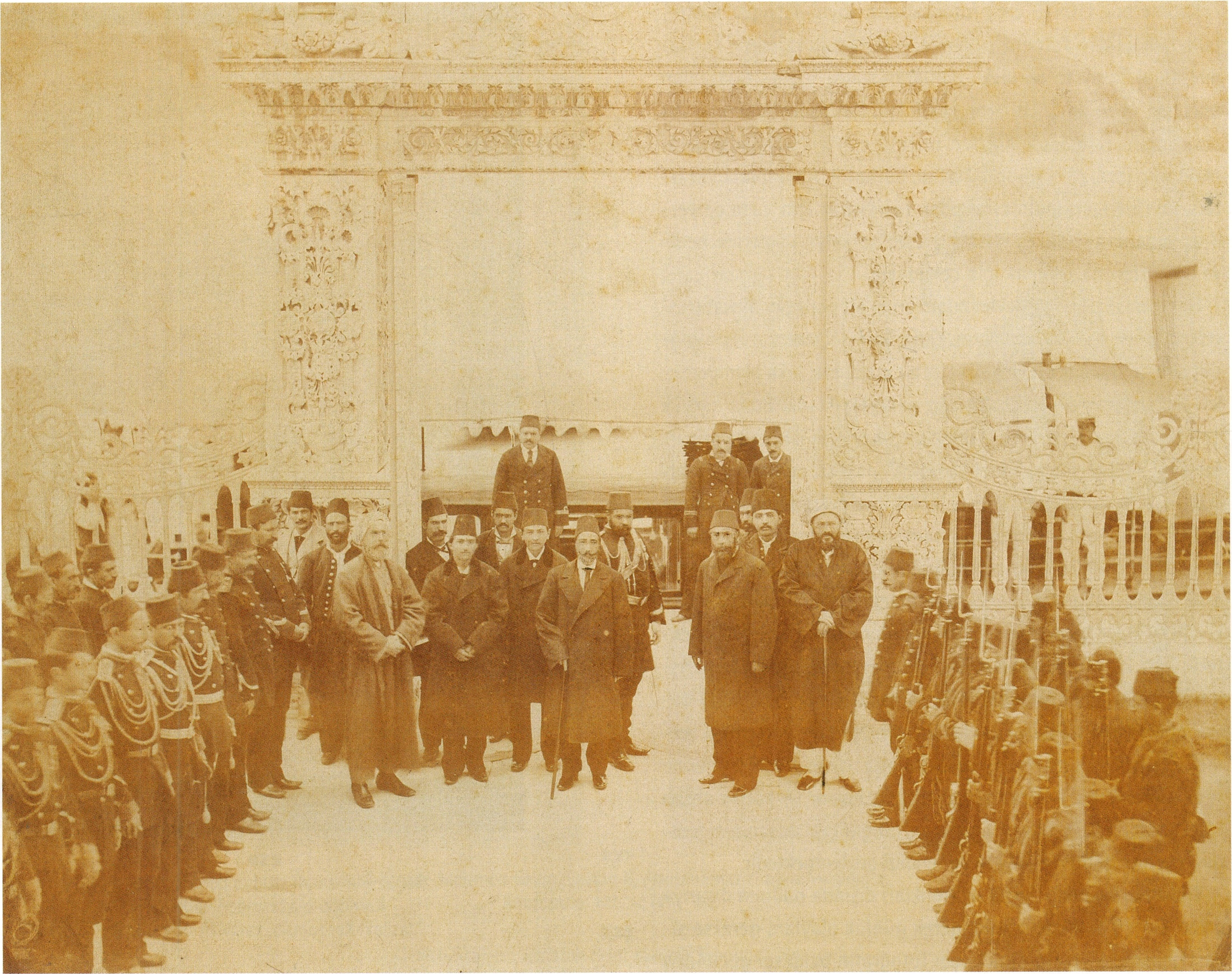
Midhat Pasha en route to his exile place Ṭâʾîf, photographed at the dock before his boarding to the ʿİzzu'd-Dîn Steamship through a steamboat, 28 July 1881 (photograph: Vasilakis Kargopoulos).

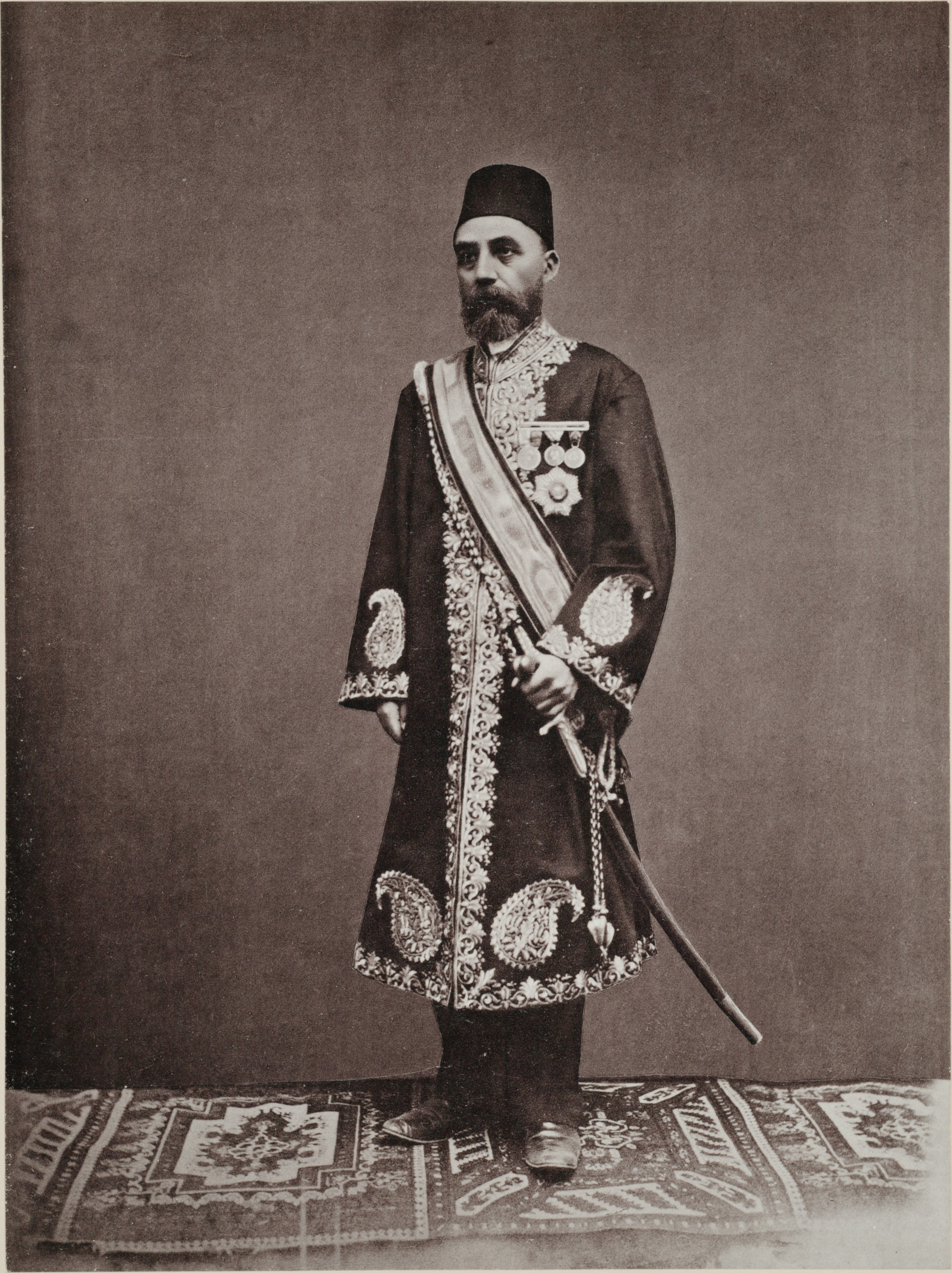
Governor and the Commander of Hejaz, Osman Nuri Pasha (not to be confused with Ghazi Osman Nuri Pasha), who carried out the extra-judicial execution, photographed during his Hejaz service.

He served briefly in İzmir as governor of the vilayet of Aydin, but on 17 May 1881, after only a few months on that post, he was arrested. Ahmed Cevdet Pasha, the justice minister, brought him to Istanbul, where he was charged with the murder of Sultan Abdulaziz. The interrogation and court proceedings took place at Yıldız. In conclusion, he was convicted and charged with the murder, and was sentenced to death. However the execution was commuted to life imprisonment in Taif in Hejaz.

Some historians claim that these to be trumped-up accusations as they believe that confessions were extracted from some suspects through the use of torture, and the use of forged evidence and paid witnesses led to his conviction. However, they claim that the British pressure impeded his execution, so he was imprisoned in the fortress of Taif, in Hejaz. It was reported that, soon after his arrival, the Emir of Mecca received a message from Istanbul demanding the death of Midhat from "an accident". The incumbent Emir Abdul Muttalib was a close friend of Midhat however, and no action was taken by him. As a result, Osman Pasha (Uthman Pasha), governor of Hejaz, surrounded the Emir's summer residence in Taif and imprisoned him. After that, Midhat Pasha's fate was sealed. He was strangled to death in his cell on 26 April 1883.

Midhat Pasha's remains were brought from Taif and interned in the Monument of Liberty on 26 June 1951, in a ceremony attended by President Celâl Bayar.

== Legacy ==
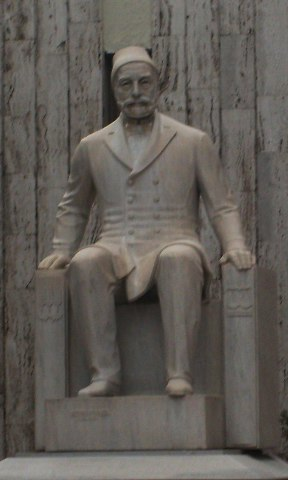
Statue of Midhat Pasha in Ankara

The British historian Caroline Finkel describes Midhat as "a true representative of Tanzimat optimism, who believed that separatist tendencies could be best countered by demonstrating the benefits of good government." The Midhat Pasha Souq in Damascus still bears his name. Bernard Lewis describes Midhat Pasha "one of the ablest administrators in the Ottoman service." Going on to state "[his] term of office as Vali of the Danube province showed that, given the necessary goodwill and ability, the new system could work very well." Midhat Pasha is described as a person with a liberal attitude.

== Gallery ==
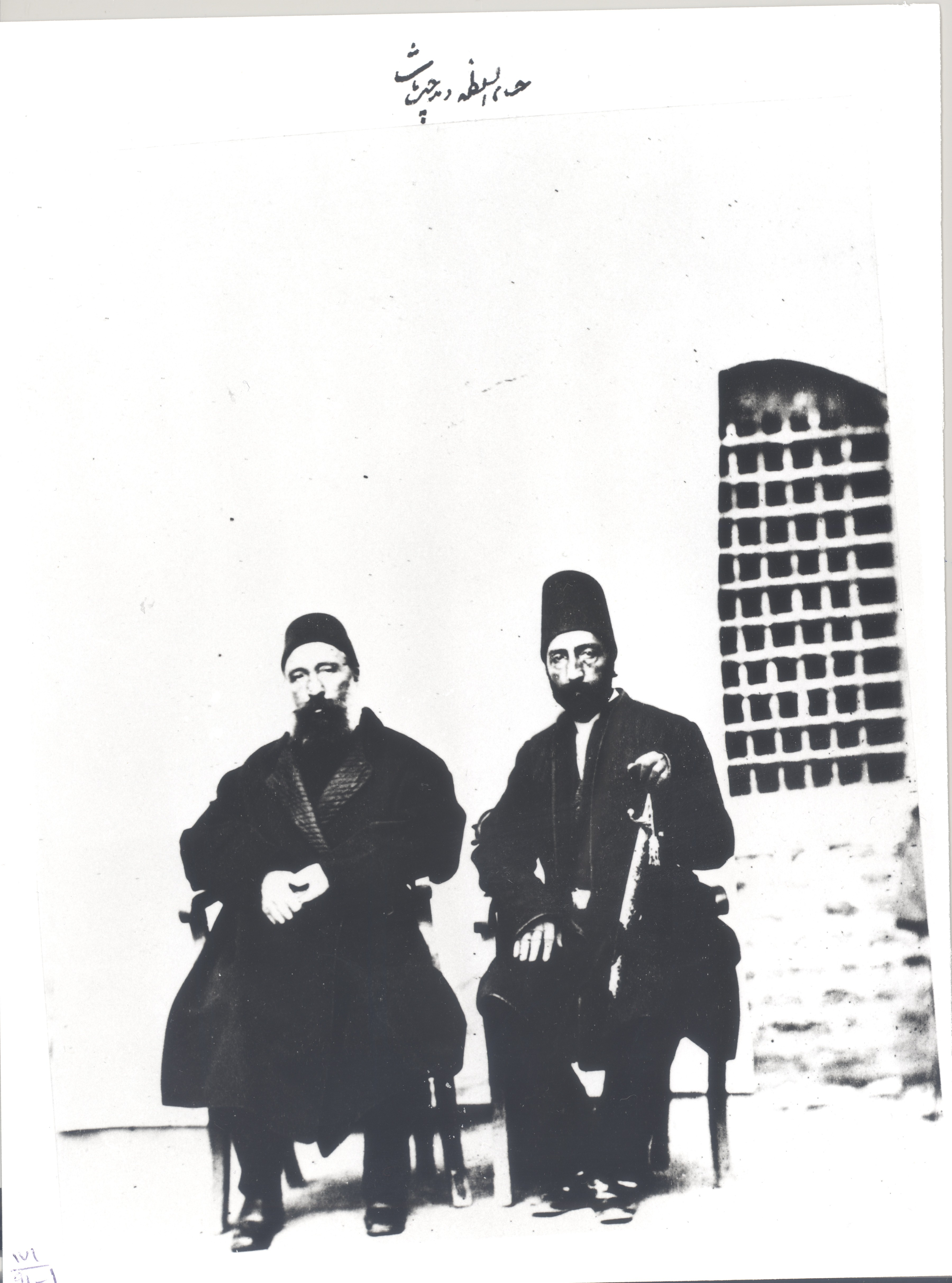
Midhat Pasha (left) with the Iranian Qajar prince Morad Mirza Hesam o-Saltaneh (right), ca. 1870

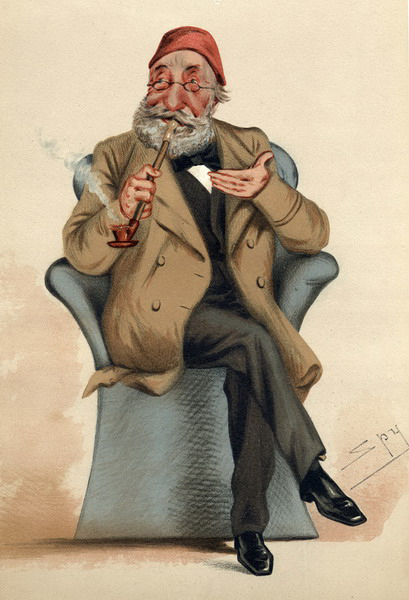
Midhat Pasha on the cover of Vanity Fair, 30 June 1877

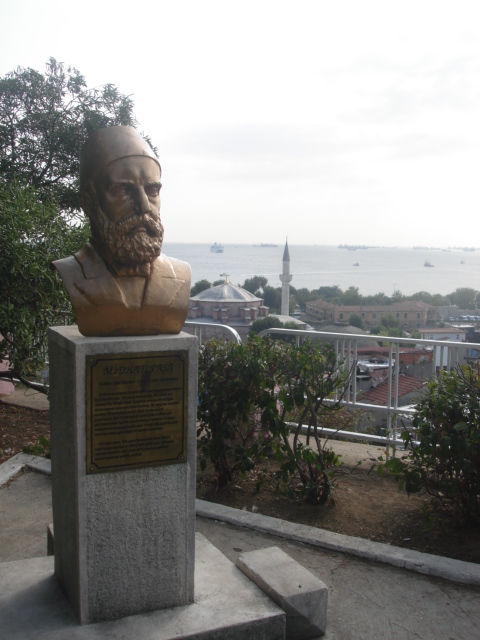
Bust of Midhat Pasha in Istanbul

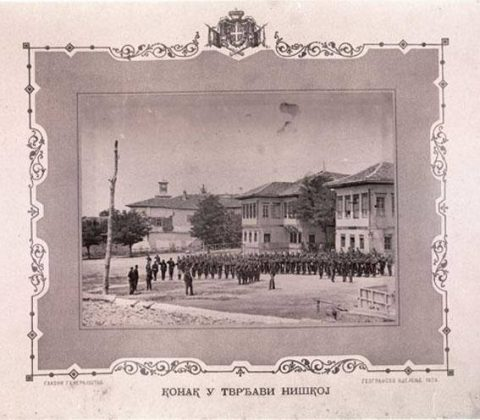
Midhat Pasha's palace in Niš

== See also ==
- Krikor Odian, an advisor to Midhat

== Sources ==
- Davison, Roderic (1963), Reform in the Ottoman Empire: 1856-1876, Princeton, New Jersey: Princeton University Press

Political offices
Preceded by Mahmud Nedim Pasha	Grand Vizier of the Ottoman Empire; 31 July 1872 – 19 October 1872	Succeeded by Mehmed Rushdi Pasha
Preceded by Mehmed Rushdi Pasha	Grand Vizier of the Ottoman Empire; 19 December 1876 – 5 February 1877	Succeeded by Ibrahim Edhem Pasha
Preceded by Sabri Pasha	Governor of Aidin; 1880 – 17 May 1881	Succeeded by Ali Pasha
Preceded by	Governor of Ottoman Syria; 22 November 1878 – 31 August 1881	Succeeded by
