= 1876 Ottoman coup d'état =

Revolt that took place in the Ottoman Empire in 1876

- Part of the Decline and modernization of the Ottoman Empire
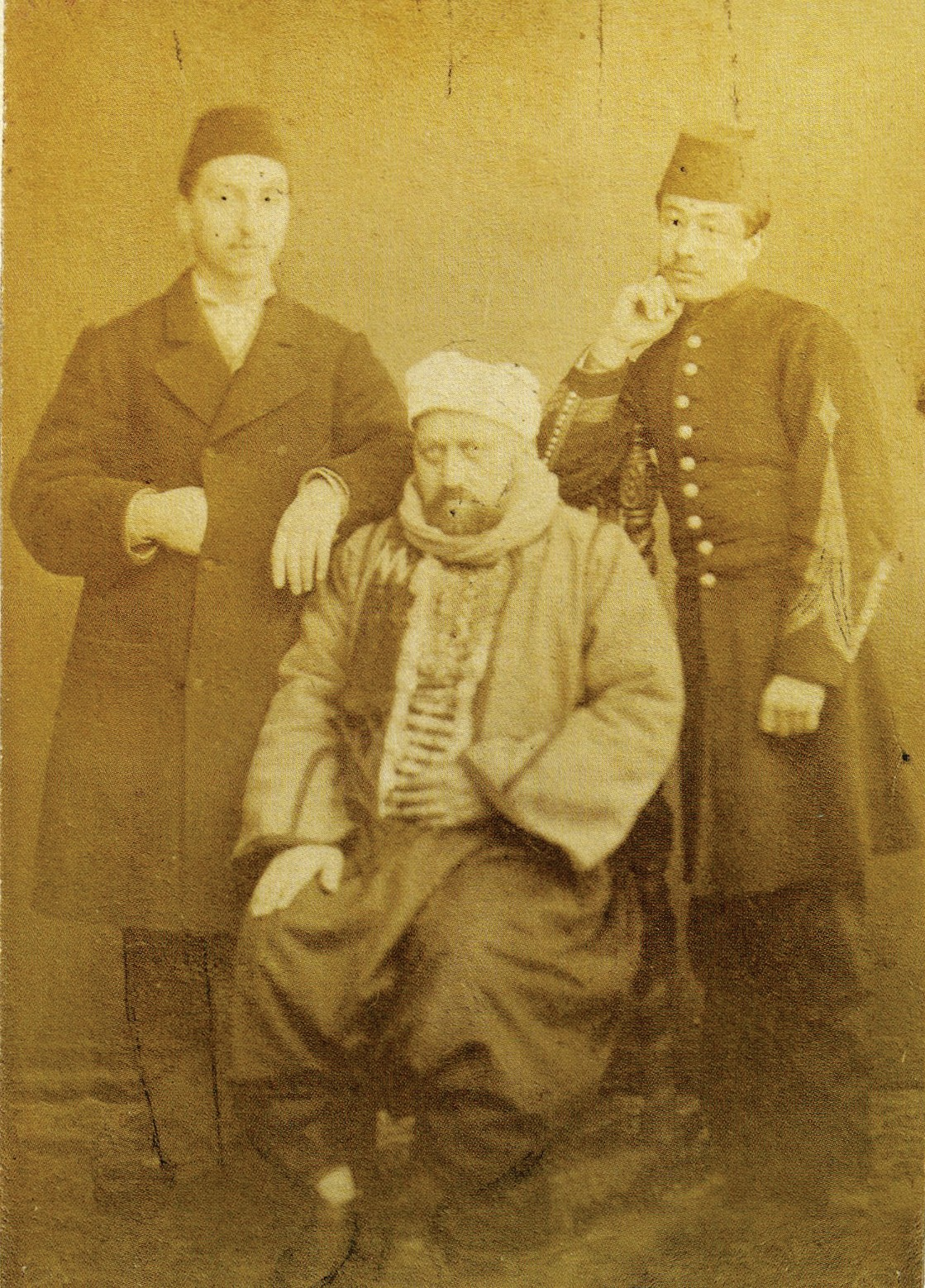
- The alleged (disputed) photograph of Abdulaziz, supposedly taken after his deposition. In earlier photographs taken by Abdullah Frères the beard of Abdulaziz is partially white around his chin, which is not the case in this image. Differences in the shape of the skull and eyes are also among the disputed details.
| Date | 30 May 1876 |
| Location | Ottoman Empire |
| Result | Coup successful: Overthrow of Sultan Abdul Aziz; Murad ascended the throne |

Belligerents
| Opposition to Abdul Aziz: Sublime Porte; Ottoman Army; Young Ottomans | Ottoman Imperial Government |

Commanders and leaders
| Midhat Pasha; Hüseyin Avni Pasha; Süleyman Pasha; Mehmed Rüşdi Pasha; Damat Mahmud Celâleddin Pasha; Hasan Hayrullah Efendi; Political support: Prince Murad; Prince Abdul Hamid | Abdul Aziz (surrendered) †/ ‡‡ (Cause of death disputed); Pertevniyal Sultan; Mahmud Nedim Pasha (surrendered); Supported by: Nikolay Ignatyev (alleged) |

On 30 May 1876, a bloodless military coup d'état occurred in the Ottoman capital of Istanbul, which resulted in the dethronement of the Ottoman Sultan Abdulaziz, and subsequently, the appointment of Murad V as the Sultan. The Ottoman Empire would be dominated by a constitutional committee chaired by Midhat Pasha for the next two years, a period known as the First Constitutional Era.

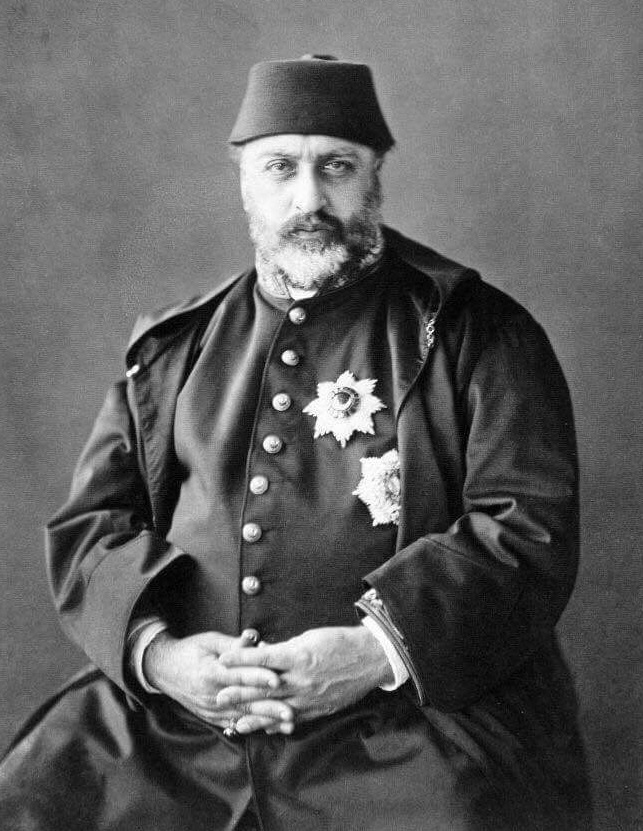
Sultan Abdulaziz, who was deposed in the coup d'état of May 30, 1876

== Background ==
In the last period of Abdulaziz's reign, the economic situation was getting worse. In 1875, uprisings against the Ottoman Empire broke out in Serbia, the Aegean Islands, Egypt, Montenegro, Romania and Bosnia-Herzegovina. The Bulgarian Revolts, which broke out in the Panagurishte region in April 1876, spread to the entire Sredna Gora region. Around 1,000 Muslim people living in the region were killed by the rebellious Bulgarians. As a result, reciprocal massacres took place between Bulgarians and Caucasian Muslims, such as Circassians and Abazas, who were expelled from the Caucasus by the Russian Empire and forced to migrate to the region. These massacres were evaluated as if they were committed against the Bulgarians unilaterally in Europe, causing a negative atmosphere around the Ottoman Empire.

Thereupon, the European countries' various interventions against the Ottoman Empire created discomfort among the Ottoman people. On May 9, 1876, students in the Fatih district of Istanbul protested. The number of demonstrators reached 5,000 in a short time. On 11 May, Grand Vizier Mahmut Nedim Pasha was dismissed and Mehmed Rüşdi Pasha came in his place. In addition, Hasan Hayrullah Efendi became the Sheikh-ul-Islam instead of Hasan Fehmi Efendi. Hüseyin Avni Pasha was also made a serasker. But the demonstrations did not end. On 17 May, demonstrations were held again in Fatih and in Beyazıt squares.

== Coup and aftermath ==
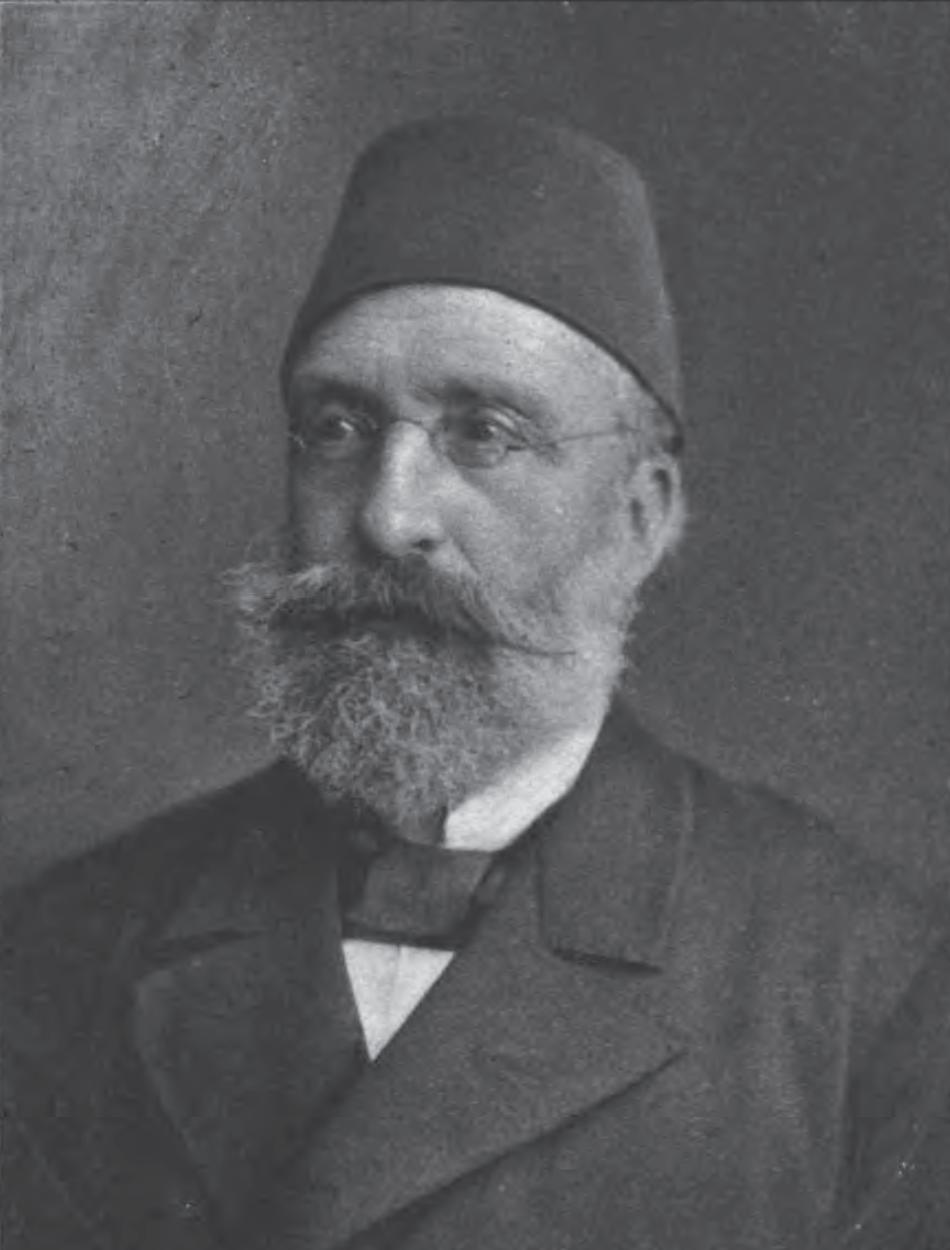
Midhat Pasha, one of the leaders of the 30 May 1876 coup

One day before the coup, on May 29, 1876, the head of the Young Ottoman secret society, Midhat Pasha, serasker Hüseyin Avni Pasha, War School Minister Süleyman Pasha, Council of Military Chief Ahmed Pasha received a fatwa from the new Sheikh-ul-Islam Hayrullah for the removal of the Sultan. Everything was ready for the coup to take place the next day.

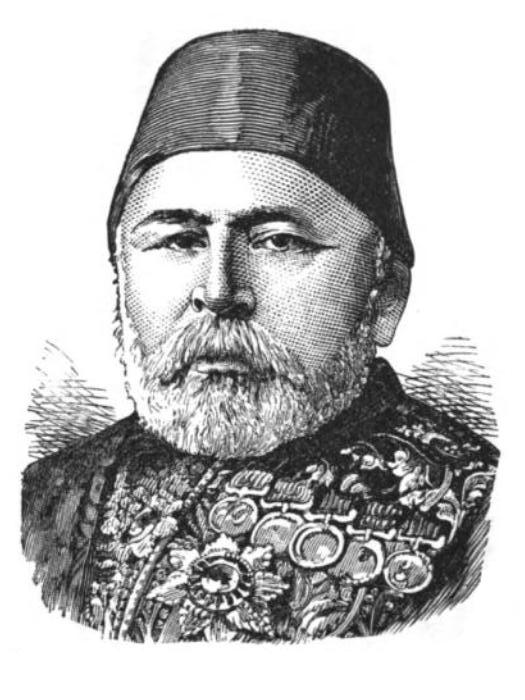
Hüseyin Avni Pasha, one of the leaders of the 30 May 1876 Coup

On 30 May, the students of the Military Academy took action under the command of Süleyman Pasha, and the soldiers in the Taşkışla and Gümüşsuyu barracks were under the command of the Istanbul army commander, Refik Pasha. Madrasah students also joined the soldiers. Dolmabahçe Palace was surrounded. Abdulaziz, who was dethroned, was removed from the palace in a boat. In his place, Murad V was declared the Ottoman sultan.

The ousted sultan, who was detained in Feriye Palace, was found dead on 4 June with his wrists slit. Neşerek Kadın Efendi, one of Abdülaziz's wives, died on 11 June. Neşerek's brother, Hasan the Circassian, who held these state officials responsible for the events that dethroned Abdülaziz, went to Midhat Pasha's mansion on 15 June 1876 and in a murderous rampage killed War Minister Avni Pasha and Foreign Minister Mehmed Raşid Pasha. Five were killed until Hasan the Circassian was subdued. After this incident, the mental health of Sultan Murad V, who was already depressed, got worse. On August 31, a fatwa was obtained from the Sheikh-ul-Islam, and he was dethroned and replaced by Abdul Hamid II.

The period of constitutional rule in the Ottoman Empire, known as the First Constitutional Era, ended only two years later, in the aftermath of the 1877-1878 Russo-Turkish War. Sultan Abdul Hamid II outmaneuvered the constitutionalists by proroguing the constitution and parliament. The conspirators of the 1876 coup were soon purged, jailed, exiled, and assassinated in the Yıldız Trials as the Sultan consolidated his autocratic regime.

== See also ==
- Vatan Yahut Silistre

== Bibliography ==
- Davison, Roderic (1963), Reform in the Ottoman Empire: 1856-1876, Princeton, New Jersey: Princeton University Press
- Yılmaz Öztuna, Bir Darbenin Anatomisi, Babıali Kültür Yayınları; ISBN 975-8486-46-2; İstanbul 2003
