= Al-Zaura =

- Type: Newspaper
- Founder: Midhat Pasha
- Founded: 15 June 1869
- Ceased publication: 13 March 1917
- Language: Arabic and Turkish
- Headquarters: Baghdad

Al-Zaura (also spelt as Al-Zawra) was a newspaper published in Baghdad by the then Ottoman Governor of Iraq Midhat Pasha in 1869. It was the official newspaper of the then Ottoman Province of Baghdad and the first newspaper to be published in Iraq. It was published in Arabic and Turkish languages. It was a biweekly newspaper published every Tuesday and Saturday. It was started after a personal effort by Midhat Pasha who brought a printing press from Paris. It was shut down in 1917 after Ottoman Rule came to an end in Iraq and the British gained control of Iraq over 2607 issues had been published.

== Images ==
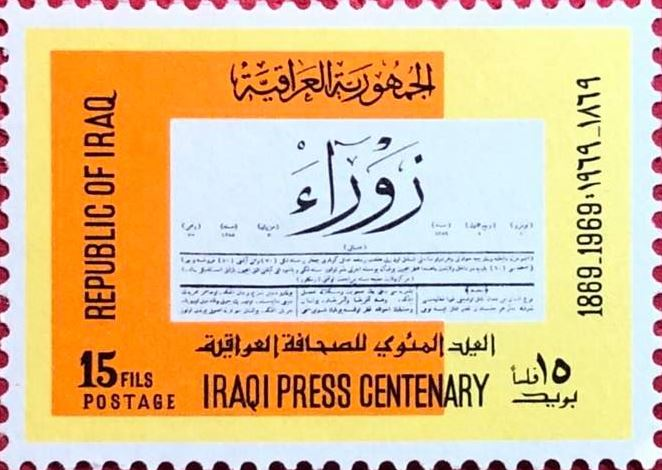
An Iraqi postage stamp of 15 fils issued in 1969 on the occasion of the centenary of the Iraqi press, and the anniversary of the founding of (Al-Zawraa), the first Iraqi newspaper in 1869.
