= Tarih-i Cevdet =

19th century Turkish book

- Original edition of the first volume of the work.
- Author: Ahmed Cevdet Pasha
- Language: Ottoman Turkish
- Subject: Ottoman History
- Publisher: Matbaa-i Âmire
- Publication place: Ottoman Empire

Tarih-i Cevdet (Ottoman Turkish: تاریخ جودت) is a twelve-volume work of Ottoman history written by the Ottoman statesman Ahmed Cevdet Pasha, whose first volumes were published in 1854 and which was completed in 1884.

The work covers the history of the Ottoman Empire between 1774 and 1825 and is regarded as one of the most important examples of late Ottoman Turkish historical prose.

Produced over a period of thirty years, Tarih-i Cevdet was written following the decision of the Encümen-i Daniş to commission an official history of the Ottoman Empire. Joseph von Hammer, an honorary member of the Encümen-i Daniş and an Ottoman historian, published his ten-volume Geschichte des osmanischen Reiches between 1827 and 1832, in which he covered the history of the empire from its foundation up to 1774. The task of narrating the period from 1774 to 1825 was assigned to Ahmed Cevdet Pasha.

The sultan’s decree for the writing of the history was issued on 9 Muharram 1270 (12 October 1853). Cevdet Pasha worked on the first three volumes simultaneously and presented them together in 1854. As the sultan was satisfied with this work, the author’s rank as a müderris was promoted to the level of Musila-i Süleymaniye, and in 1855 he was appointed as the official historian of the state.

Continuing to write the work, Cevdet Pasha devoted the first third of the sixth volume entirely to European history from Antiquity to the French Revolution, with particular emphasis on the revolution’s effects on the Ottoman Empire. The assignment given to the author to prepare the legal code known as the Mecelle delayed the writing of the final six volumes of Tarih-i Cevdet. The work was ultimately completed in 1884.

While writing the work, Cevdet Pasha carefully examined chronicle histories, collections, reports, ambassadorial accounts, and archival documents. He consulted the views of those who had witnessed events and applied a rigorous critical evaluation before using these sources. Official documents, decrees, and treaty texts were appended at the end of each volume.

== Sources ==
- Paşa, Ahmet Cevdet (1972). Tarih-i Cevdet (in Turkish). Sabah.
