= Süleyman Fehim =

Ottoman teacher and poet (1789–1846)

Süleyman Fehim Efendi (1789–1846) was a teacher and poet of Persian in the Ottoman Empire.

== Biography ==
Of Turkish origin, he flourished in the first half of the 19th century. Information regarding his youth and education remains unknown. He was initially a servant and student of the scholar Ismail Farrukh Efendi. Under him, Suleyman Fehim matured and became very adept in Persian. He then served as a civil servant in Constantinople (now Istanbul) at the royal court and the royal mint, as well as in the Balkans (Rumelia). He soon however decided to retire and dedicate his life to studying and writing, and teaching Persian occasionally. Upon his return to Constantinople, he taught Persian to a variety of students, including Ahmed Cevdet Pasha and Fatin Efendi.

Fehim wrote a small divan consisting of poems inspired by the "Indian style" (Sabk-e Hendi in Persian, or Sebk-i Hindi in Turkish) of Persian poetry. It was published in 1846 in Constantinople. He also wrote the Sefinet al-Shu'ara, which combines an abridged and loose translation of Dawlatshah Samarqandi's Tadhkirat al-shu'ara, as well as portions of Jami's Nahafat al-ons, Sam Mirza's Tadhkera as well as Ali-Shir Nava'i's Majales al-nafa'es. Suleyman Fehim's Sefinet al-Shu'ara only comprises four classes and an appendix, in contrast to Dawlatshah's original seven classes. In addition, Suleyman Fehim's work "is somewhat careless in the order of presentation of the poets". It was authored at the beginning of Mahmud II's reign (1808–1839), and he dedicated it to the Ottoman statesman Halet Efendi. The work was published in Constantinople in 1843.

He is known to have translated the first segment of the Persian divan of Saib Tabrizi.
