= Mehmed Rushdi Pasha =

Ottoman reformist, statesman and Grand Vizier (1811–1882)

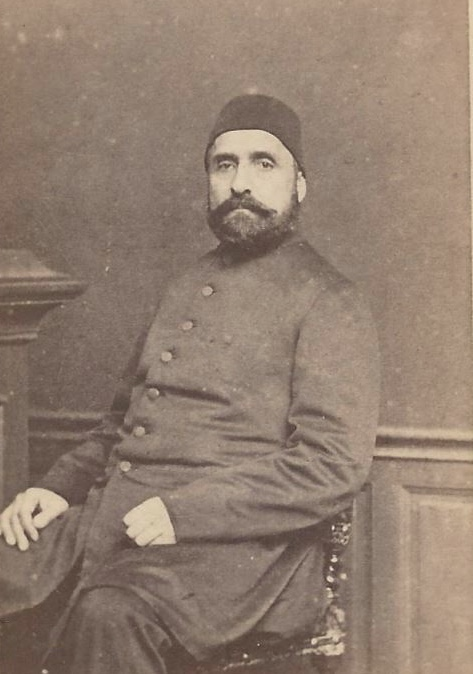

Grand Vizier of the Ottoman Empire

Personal details
- Born: 1811 Ayancik, Anatolia Eyalet, Ottoman Empire
- Died: 27 March 1882 (aged 70–71) Manisa, Aidin Vilayet, Ottoman Empire

Mehmed Rushdi Pasha (Ottoman Turkish: محمد رشدى پاشا; Turkish: Mehmet Rüşdi Paşa or Mütercim Rüşdi Paşa; 1811 – 27 March 1882) was an Ottoman reformist and statesman. He served as Grand Vizier of the Ottoman Empire during five separate terms. Midhat Pasha preceded him. Mehmed Rushdi Pasha was a fervent supporter of the Tanzimat. He believed the empire would lag behind the West if no attempt were made to modernize itself. He served as a Translator of Military texts and a military colonel in his youth. He was born in 1811 and died on 27 March 1882.

== Early life ==
Mutercim Rushdie Pasha was born to a poor boatman in 1811 in Ayancık. When he was three, his family moved to Istanbul circa 1814. In Istanbul, Rushdie Pasha studied in the local school system. As he got older, he was recruited by the military and studied under Lord Tanase. Under the guidance of Lord Tanase, he mastered the ability to read, write, and speak French. After working with Lord Tanase, Rushdie Pasha was discovered to be an asset to the Ottoman Empire. He caught the eye of Sultan Abdulhamid. Sultan Abdulhamid assigned Rushdie Pasha a translation position with some of the best translators in the Ottoman Empire. Rushdie became very well known in the Empire for his translations. Two of his most important translated texts were manuals of French military tactics and military training. After these translations, he was again promoted and sent to England to study and translate more Western works. Rushdie was surrounded by Western ideas similar to those of his reformist colleagues, who later pushed for Tanzimat reforms.

== Military career ==
In 1839, at the age of 28, he was promoted to the rank of Colonel. Rushdie Pasha continued his military career, and in 1843, he became a leader in the military council. He continued to contribute his talents to the military until he resigned from his position at the age of 42 in 1853. He was nominated to be the Governor of Damascus, but Rushdie Pasha denied the position. He even declined other government positions to avoid working with Mehmed Ali Pasha.

== First term ==
- During Abdulmejid I's reign: 24 December 1859 – 28 May 1860

On 24 December 1859, Mutercim Rushdie Pasha was appointed the Grand Vizir of the Ottoman Empire under Sultan Abdulmecit for the first time. Rushdie Pasha was constantly involved in internal conflicts having to do with the policy of the Ottoman government. There was a notable friction between Rushdie Pasha and Mehmed Pasha, as well as other officials who wanted to do things differently from Rushdie Pasha. This internal drama made it difficult for Rushdie Pasha to hold on to his position of Grand Vizier for very long, and he was replaced on 28 May 1860. This will continue to be a motif in Rushdie Pasha's service; his controversial viewpoints and strong will lead to other short-lived terms as the Grand Vizier of the Ottoman Empire. After his first stressful service as Grand Vizier of the Ottoman Empire, Rushdie Pasha took an excursion to Berlin in 1860. Shortly after visiting Berlin, he visited Paris and even toured other European countries. In 1861, Rushdie Pasha returned to Istanbul.

== Second term ==
- During Abdülaziz's reign: 5 June 1866 – 11 February 1867

On 5 June 1866, Rushdie Pasha was appointed Grand Vizier to the Ottoman Empire for the second time in his career despite the anti-reformist opposition in the government. Even though Rushdie beat his rivals in the Government for the seat of Grand Vizir, the internal resistance to reform led to his removal from the seat of Grand Vizier for the second time on 11 February 1867.

== Third term ==
- During Abdülaziz's reign: 19 October 1872 – 15 March 1873

On 19 October 1872, Sultan Abdulaziz appointed Rushdie Pasha as Grand Vizier for the third time in his now politically oriented career. This term was short-lived and only lasted approximately four months. Rushdie Pasha was removed once again due to his reformist viewpoints. There were insurrections and uprisings within the empire during this time. Students were performing demonstrations and spreading reformist ideals. The civil unrest led to Rushdie Pasha being again appointed as Grand Vizier of the Ottoman Empire for his first term on 12 May 1876. This was done to appease the reformists and to stabilize the unrest. However, this did not save Sultan Abdulaziz who was overthrown by his ministers on 30 May 1876.

== Fourth term ==
- During Murat V's and Abdülhamit II's reign: 12 May 1876 – 19 December 1876

After the disposal of Abdulaziz, officials of the Ottoman Empire appointed Murad V as the new Sultan. Sultan Murad V was young and heavily influenced by the ideas of the Tanzimat reforms. The French and other Western cultures heavily influenced Sultan Murad V. Rushdie Pasha continued to serve as Grand Vizier under Sultan Murad V. Sultan Murad V was supposed to pass a constitution. However, even with Rushdie Pasha's support, Murad V could not pass reforms and was replaced by his brother, Sultan Abdulhamit II. Abdulhamit II was not favored by Rushdie Pasha. Rushdie Pasha disagreed with Abdulhamit II's indulgence and lack of focus on government affairs. He confronted Abdulhamit II about skipping a conference meeting due to claiming "illness." Rushdie Pasha resigned from the position of Grand Vizir on 19 December 1876 at the age of 65 due to his lack of tolerance for Sultan Abdulhamit II. Abdulhamit II was centralizing power and removing any reforms accomplished. Abdulhamit II took power away from the government and suspended the constitution.

== Fifth term and death ==
- During Abdul Hamid II's reign: 28 May 1878 – 4 June 1878

Rushdie Pasha was appointed for his fifth and last term on 28 May 1878. He immediately began investigating the circumstances of Sultan Abdulaziz' death. After pursuing the investigation, he was removed from office after only one week. After making his accusations, he was tried and sentenced to a life of exile. Mutercim Rushdie Pasha died from a disease in his nervous system in Manisa shortly after he was sentenced to exile on 27 March 1882 at the age of 71. His body was buried in the garden of Hatuniye Mosque.
