= Mahmud Nedim Pasha =

Grand Vizier of the Ottoman Empire (1871–1872, 1875–1876)

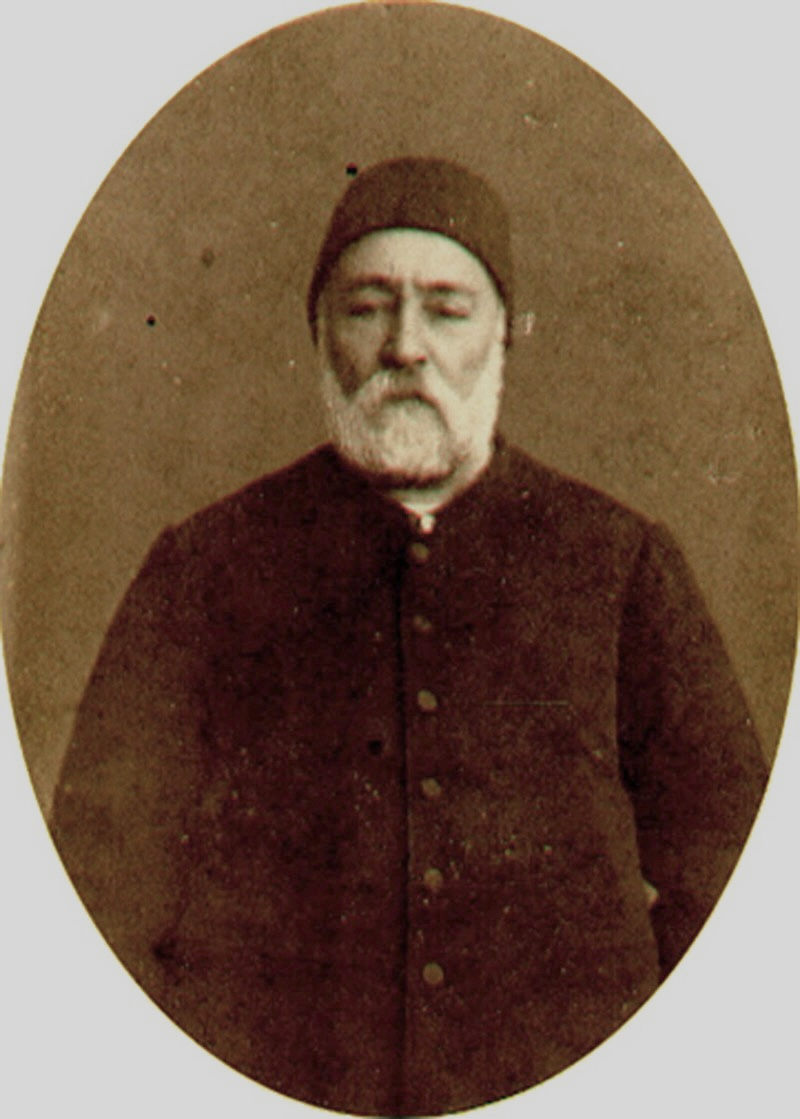

Grand Vizier of the Ottoman Empire

Ottoman Minister of the Interior
- In office 1879–1882
- Monarch: Abdul Hamid II
- Preceded by: Kadri Pasha
- Succeeded by: Ibrahim Edhem Pasha

Personal details
- Born: 1818 Constantinople, Ottoman Empire
- Died: 14 May 1883 (aged 64–65) Constantinople, Ottoman Empire

Mahmud Nedim Pasha (Turkish: Mahmut Nedim Paşa) was an Ottoman conservative statesman of ethnic Georgian background, who served as Grand Vizier of the Ottoman Empire between 1871–1872 and 1875–1876.

== Biography ==
He was the son of Mehmed Najib Pasha, a governor-general of Baghdad in Ottoman Iraq. After occupying various subordinate posts at the Porte, he became under-secretary of state for foreign affairs, governor-general of Damascus and İzmir (Smyrna), minister of commerce, and governor-general of Tripoli. He was also successively Minister of Justice and Minister of the Navy in 1869, and ultimately grand vizier (identical to a prime minister at this point in the Empire) twice from 1871 to 1872 and from 1875 to 1876.

He was high in favour with Sultan Abdul Aziz and fell much under the influence of General Nicholas Pavlovich Ignatiev, the forceful Russian ambassador before the Russo-Turkish War (1877–78), his perceived subservience to Russia earning him the nickname of "Nedimoff". His administration was mostly unsuccessful from every point of view, and he was largely responsible for the issue of the decree suspending the interest on the Ottoman Empire's funds. He was Grand Vizier and Minister of the Interior from 1879 to late 1882.

== Notes ==
Political offices
Preceded by Salih Vamık Pasha	Governor of Sidon Eyalet; March 1855 – December 1855	Succeeded by Salih Vamık Pasha
Preceded by Mehmed Namık Pasha	Governor of Damascus Eyalet; December 1855 – September 1856	Succeeded by Izzet Ahmed Pasha
Preceded by Süleyman Refet Pasha	Governor of Aidin Eyalet; September 1856 – May 1857	Succeeded by
Preceded by Mehmed Emin Ali Pasha	Grand Vizier of the Ottoman Empire; September 1871 – 31 July 1872	Succeeded by Midhat Pasha
Preceded by Ahmed Esad Pasha	Grand Vizier of the Ottoman Empire; 21 August 1875 – 11 May 1876	Succeeded by Mehmed Rushdi Pasha
Preceded by Kadri Pasha	Minister of the Interior; 1879–1882	Succeeded by Ibrahim Edhem Pasha
