= Ilmiye =

One of the four institutions within the Ottoman state organisation

The İlmiye is one of four institutions that existed within the state organisation of the Ottoman Empire, the other three being the Imperial (mülkiye) institution; the military (seyfiye) institution; and the administrative (kalemiye) institution. The function of the İlmiye was to propagate the Muslim religion, to ensure that Islamic law was enforced properly within the courts, as well as to ensure that it was interpreted and taught properly within the Ottoman school system. The development of the İlmiye took place over the course of the sixteenth century, absorbing the Ulama, the educated class of Muslim legal scholars, in the process.

== The Emergence of the İlmiye ==
Beginning in the sixteenth century, officials in the administrative, and financial institutions were training their own apprentices instead of hiring graduates of madrases. This led to the narrowing of the Ulama's responsibilities, which once ranged across all non-military government services. They now only dealt within the judicial and educational realms of the government. This led to the İlmiye gradually becoming a hierarchical career line, and an end in itself. If a person was to graduate from a madras, and immediately take a position in the Ilmye, there was very little opportunity for them to change their career path.

By the early 17th century, the İlmiye was fully established as an institution. Within the fully established İlmiye, two distinct career paths developed: town judges, or kasabat kadis, and high dignitaries, or mollas. Town judges were those who decided to serve in low-level districts, in turn forfeiting the opportunity to serve at the highest offices within the İlmiye. The one big advantage to taking the path of a town judge, was that one would see immediate, and consistent pay right after completing one's studies at a Madrasa. If one was to take the path of a high dignitary, one would begin one's career with a teaching job in a medrasa. This would mean a few years of lower pay, but would allow one to climb the ranks of the İlmiye, eventually receiving a more lucrative, and higher-level position than a town judge would ever be able to. These higher-level positions were known as mevleviyets.

== The İlmiye and Judicial Reform ==
The power and influence of Islamic religious law and customs began to decrease as the western European ideologies began to work their way into Ottoman life. So, as Western European ideologies began to creep their way into the Ottoman Empire in the 18th and 19th centuries, so did the pressure for the Ottoman government to provide a more secular judicial system. Thus, the Kanun, a secular legal system, was introduced. This would provide non-Muslim subjects of the Empire with a legal system that they could go through if need be. The İlmiye and the Ulema showed no real dissent towards the introduction of the Kanun, and even though they were allowed to interfere with rulings from the Kanun courts, they rarely exercised that right, and generally allowed them to run themselves. Although this was true of the Ulama and the İlmiye, a lot of religious scholars within these groups were not sure how reform would effect the integrity of the Sharia law. After initially supporting reform in the belief that it would strengthen the Empire as an Islamic state, members of the İlmiye and the Ulama fell into confusion when they discovered that reform was going to mean secularization. This would cause a riff within the religious scholarly community over whether or not secularization was in line with Sharia law. This split within the religious scholarly community would cause the influence of the İlmiye to deflate, while the administrative institution was gaining popularity and prestige. The influx of western ideology also affected what was known as the ghazi ideal. This was the idea that the Ottomans were militarily and culturally superior than their European neighbors. While European influence on Ottoman life grew, the idea of a ghazi ideal diminished. The Ottoman military was known to have lost its reputation as a powerful force, and in the 19th century, was barely functional at times. Along with the loss of the military's good reputation, came the diminished reputation of the İlmiye. They were looked upon as conservatives who were unwilling to change, which affected them very negatively during the reform period of the 1800s. Because of this, their influence shrank even more, and the administrative and imperial institutions gained higher statuses.

== The İlmiye and Education Reform ==
The Ulema held a long-standing monopoly over the traditional educational institutions the mektebs, and the madrasas. So, by the time Education reform came to the forefront of the Ottoman goal to advance their society, they focused on making alternative schools known as ibtidai, or primary schools. Educational reformers founded these new primary schools as an attempt to provide their own influence on higher learning within the Empire, which they believed to be a superior learning experience, than those of the mektebs and madrases. They provided supplementary equipment, books and financing as part of their efforts. The introduction of these new schools provided prospective students with a choice between secular curriculum and a religious one. However, both systems proved to be inefficient, and both fell short of the standard that they were trying to achieve. Although there were many issues with education reform in the 19th century, the Ottomans did achieve in implementing a three-tiered school system that replaced the unorganized system of old. With the influence of the reformers, the government introduced a new plan in 1845, which include reformed Qur'anic mektebs, an intermediate level known as the rusdiye, and a university, known as dar ul-funun. The plan did not come to fruition right away, but throughout the 19th century, education in the Empire went through a great change. Although this was seen as a success, Ottomans were still well behind other reformers such as the Japanese. There proved to be many difficulties in the process. Many of the schools fell short of what was expected of them, leaving another stain on the reputation of the İlmiye and the Ulama.
