= Selim Melhame Pasha =

Ottoman–Maronite statesman and politician (1851–1937)

Selim Melhame
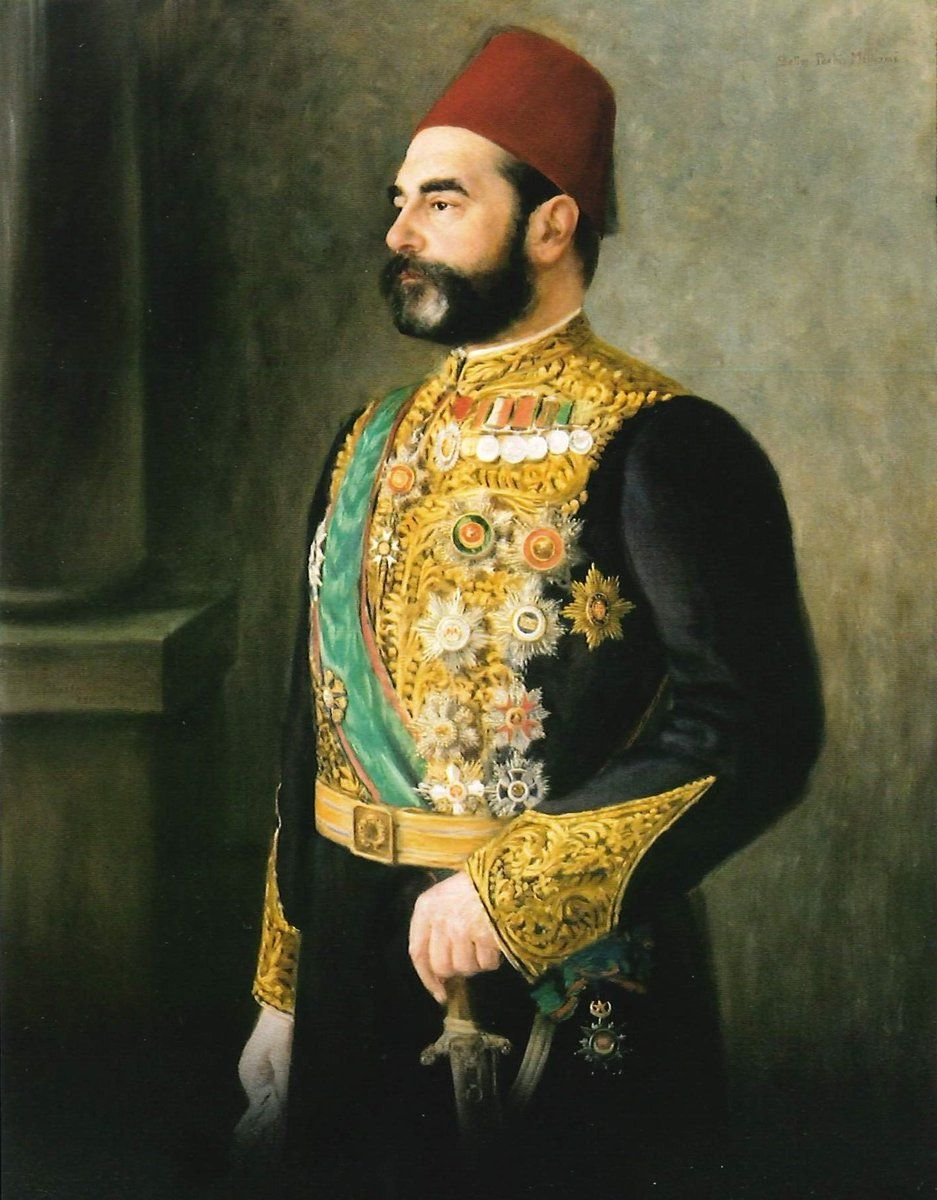

Minister of Trade and Agriculture
- In office November 1895 – 1908
- Monarch: Abdul Hamid II

Minister of Forestry
- In office November 1895 – 1908
- Monarch: Abdul Hamid II

Minister of Mines
- In office November 1895 – 1908
- Monarch: Abdul Hamid II

Personal details
- Born: 14 June 1851 Beirut, Ottoman Lebanon
- Died: 10 December 1937 (aged 86) Sanremo, Italy
- Children: Leyla Melhame; Marie; Selma; Nihad Bey; Feride; Halim Bey
- Parents: Beşare Efendi (father); Verda el-Jerva (mother)

Military service
- Branch/service: Ottoman Army: Ottoman Empire (1851–1909); Italy (1909–1937)
- Years of service: 1877–1878
- Battles/wars: Russo-Turkish War (1877–1878)

Selim Melhame (14 June 1851 – 10 December 1937) was an Ottoman statesman and politician of Maronite descent. During the Russo-Turkish war of 1877–1878, he voluntarily served in the Ottoman Army.

== Early life ==
Melhame was the son of attorney Beşare Efendi and Verda el-Jerva. The eldest of six siblings, his siblings were Necip, Habip, İskender, Filip, and Şükrü. All of the brothers held various positions in the Ottoman government and were awarded medals. Necip was an undersecretary at the Ministry of Public Works. Habip Melhame served as the Trabzon Regiment Minister, and as the Istanbul Tobacco Administration Monopoly Minister. İskender Melhame also served as the Minister of regiments in the cities of Ioannina and Thessaloniki. Filip Melhame served as a member of the Council of State, and Şükrü Melhame worked in the Malta Island branch Office.

Melhame became the secretary and confidant of Suphi Pasha, the governor of Damascus, and accompanied him as a French language teacher in the city between 1871 and 1873.

When the 1877–1878 Ottoman-Russian War broke out, Melhame and his brother Filip voluntarily joined the Ottoman army, and were appointed as the commanders of the war dispatch. After the war, Melhame returned to Istanbul, where, through the Greek banker Sarifi, he worked as the head of office, and then the branch manager, at the Düyûn-ı Umûmiye. Later, became the general manager.

== Later life ==
Melhame joined forces with Baalbek's Greek Catholic Yusuf Mutran Efendi, and founded the Beirut Port and Dock Company, contributing 100,000 francs, and became the ruler of the earldom of Perthuis and M. Raymond. Later, it also received the concession of the Damascus–Aleppo–Birecik railway and the Beirut–Damascus steam trams. These various jobs brought him about a million francs.

In 1892, Melhame was a candidate for the governorship of Lebanon, with the support of the Sublime Porte and the Sultan, but his candidacy was rejected.

On 13 February 1893, Melhame was appointed as the Minister of Trade and Agriculture of the Ottoman Empire. During his time as minister, Melhame was responsible for the renewal of trade agreements, the stock exchange business in Galata, the consolidation of Ottoman rent, the porcelain factory established in Yıldız Palace, and sensitive duties with ambassadors.

By 1908, his fortune had exceeded ten million francs.

In 1909, after Abdul Hamid II was deposed, he fled to Italy with his brother Necip, and settled in Sanremo, where he also died in 1937.

== Personal life ==
In 1881, Melhame married Aimée Crespin (the daughter of Alexandre Crespin, who was a merchant and consul of the France in Istanbul). Their children were:

- Feride], Italian general and senator, adjutant of Sultan Abdul Hamid II, and wife of Count Giovanni Romei Longhena, honorary aide to the King of Italy
- Marie (1885–1970), wife of Baron Friederich Wilderich von Fürstenberg
- Nihad Bey (1887 – ?)
- Selma (1888–1977), German army officer and German embassy attaché, wife of Baron Hans Melchior von Schlotheim
- Halim Bey
- Leyla Melhame (1891–1955), wife of Raymond de Boulloche, later Count Robert de Dampierre (1888–1974), Ambassador of France to Turkey.
