= Rosette (design) =

Round, stylized flower design

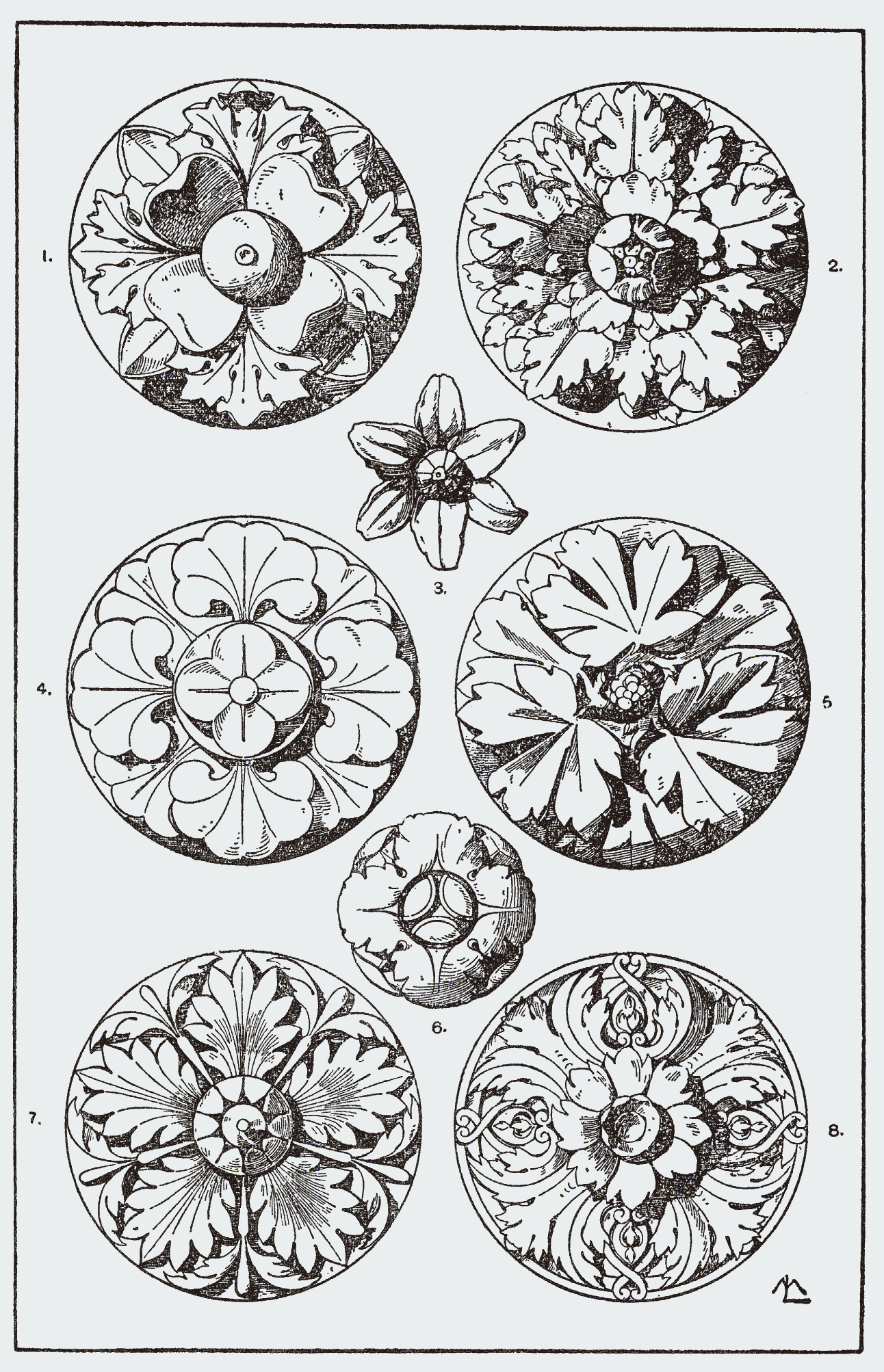
Rosette designs from Meyer's Handbook of Ornament

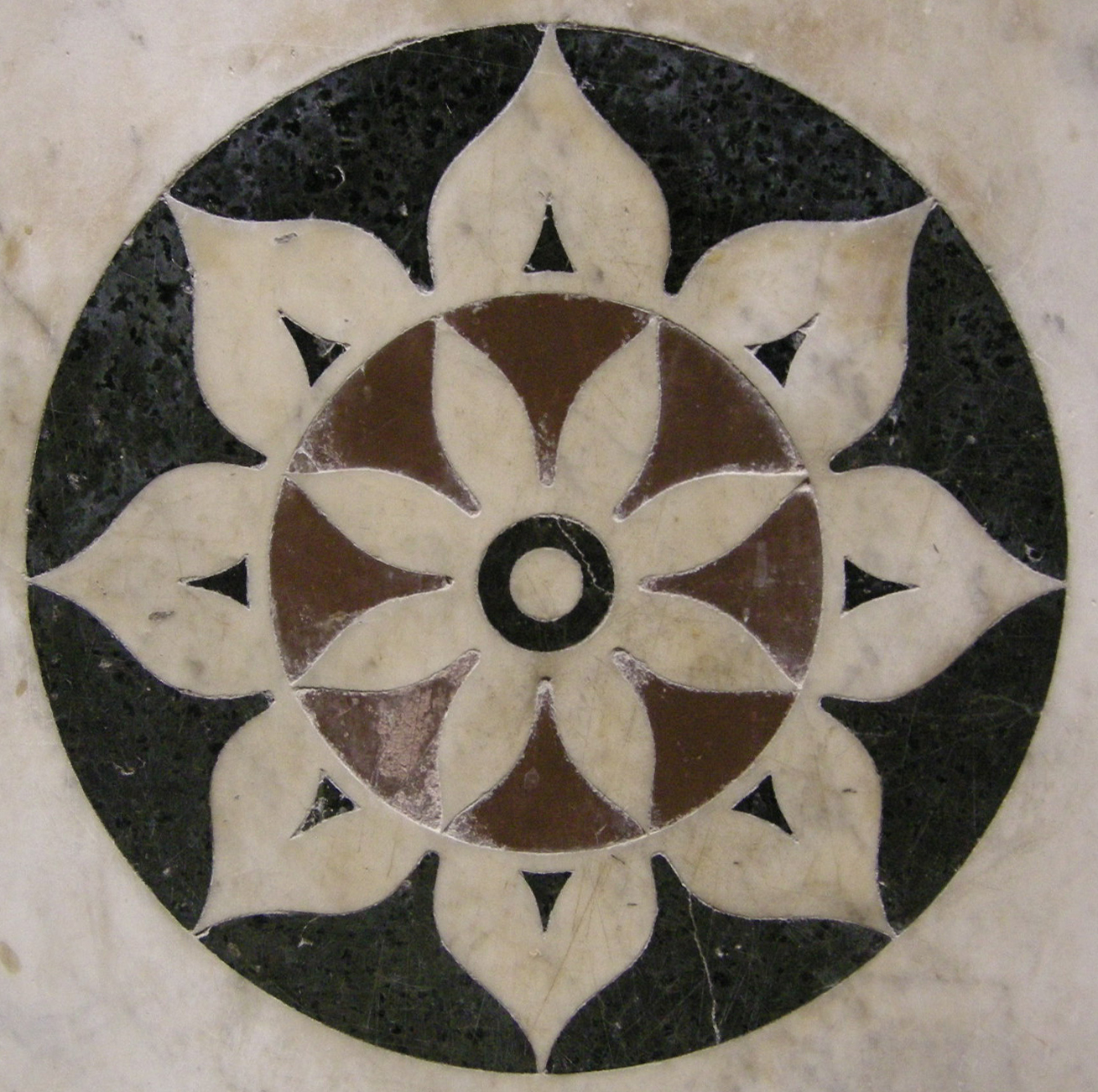
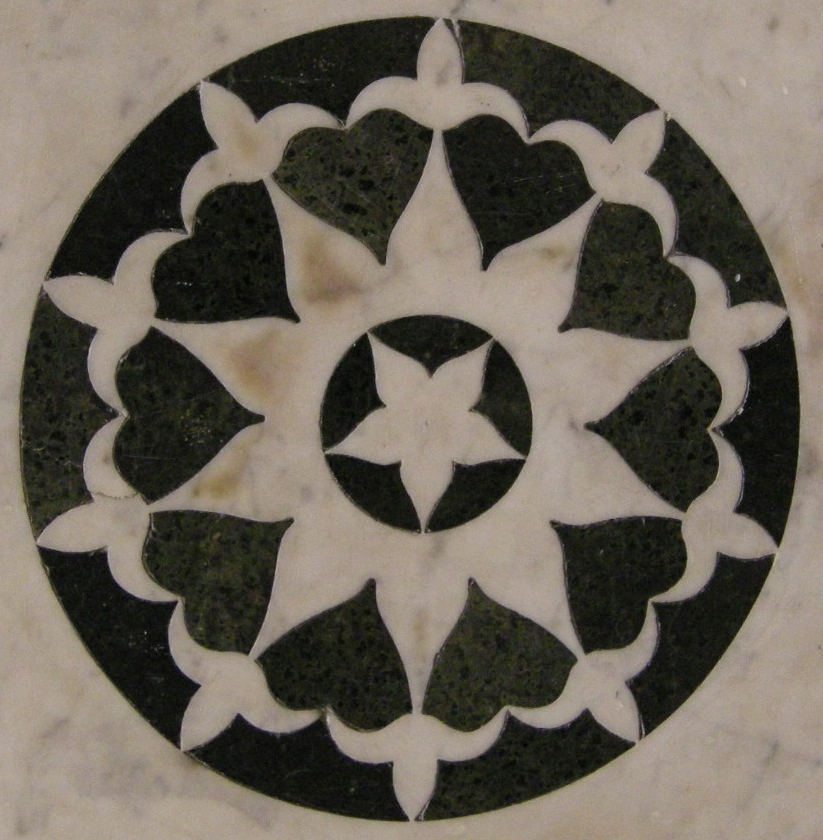
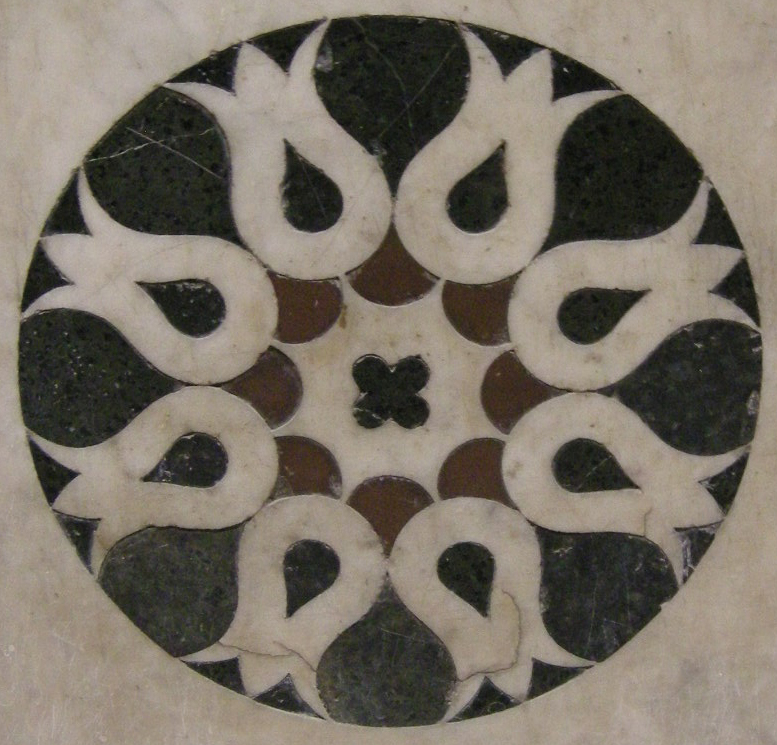
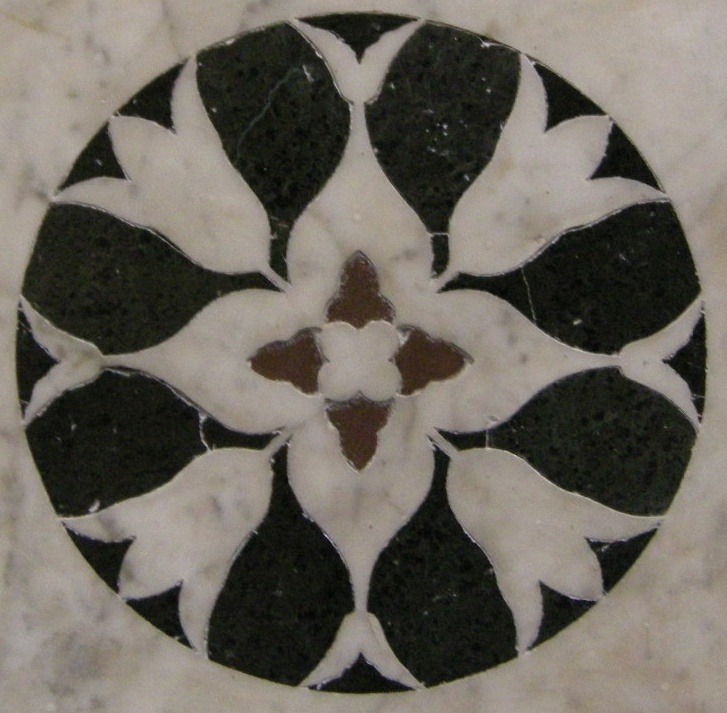
Marble rosettes of Rucellai Sepulchre

A rosette is a round, stylized flower design.

== Origin ==
The rosette derives from the natural shape of the botanical rosette, formed by leaves radiating out from the stem of a plant and visible even after the flowers have withered.

== History ==
The rosette design is used extensively in sculptural objects from antiquity, appearing in Mesopotamia, and in funeral steles' decoration in Ancient Greece. The rosette was another important symbol of Ishtar which had originally belonged to Inanna along with the Star of Ishtar.

It was adopted later in Romaneseque and Renaissance architecture, and also common in the art of Central Asia, spreading as far as India where it is used as a decorative motif in Greco-Buddhist art.

== Ancient origins ==
One of the earliest appearances of the rosette in ancient art is in early fourth millennium BC Egypt. Another early Mediterranean occurrence of the rosette design derives from Minoan Crete; among other places, the design appears on the Phaistos Disc, recovered from the eponymous archaeological site in southern Crete.

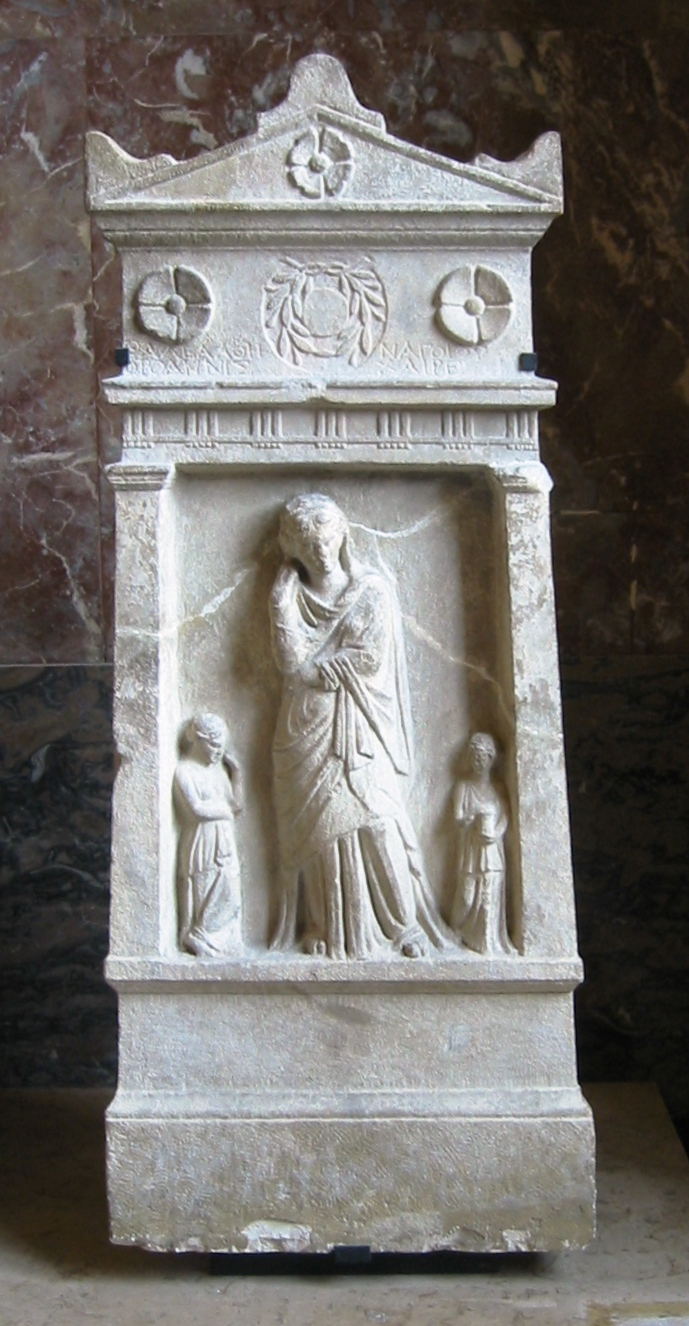
Ancient Greek funerary stele with three rosettes at the top, c. 150 BC, marble, Louvre

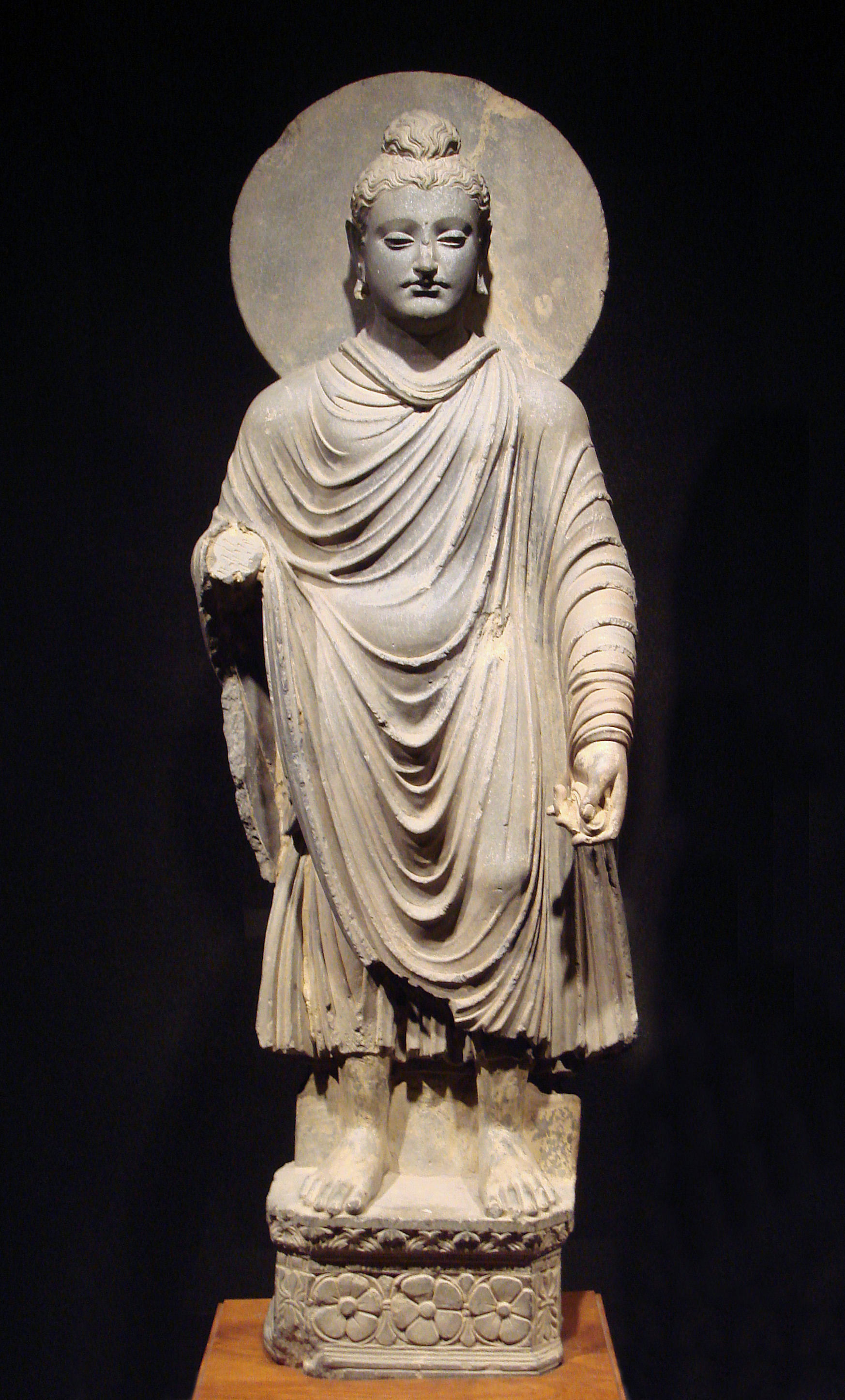
Greco-Buddhist rosettes at the bottom of a statue of the Buddha from Gandhara, 1st-2nd century AD, schistose rock, Tokyo National Museum

== Modern use ==
The formalised flower motif is often carved in stone or wood to create decorative ornaments for architecture and furniture, and in metalworking, jewelry design and the applied arts to form a decorative border or at the intersection of two materials.

Rosette decorations have been used for formal military awards. They also appear in modern, civilian clothes, and are often worn prominently in political or sporting events. Rosettes sometimes decorate musical instruments, such as around the perimeter of sound holes of guitars.

== Gallery ==
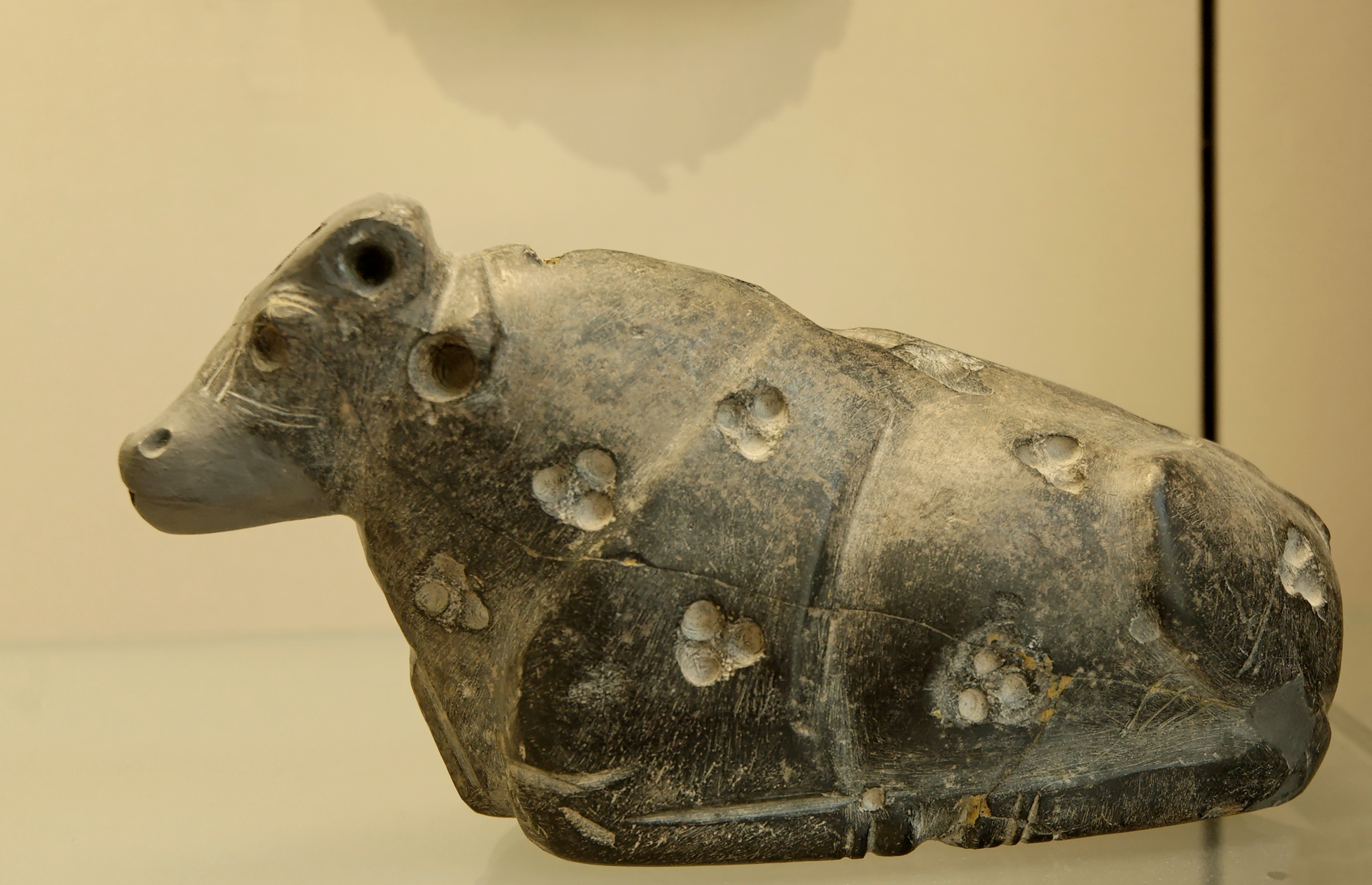
Sumerian bull with rosettes, c.3000 BC, black marble, Louvre

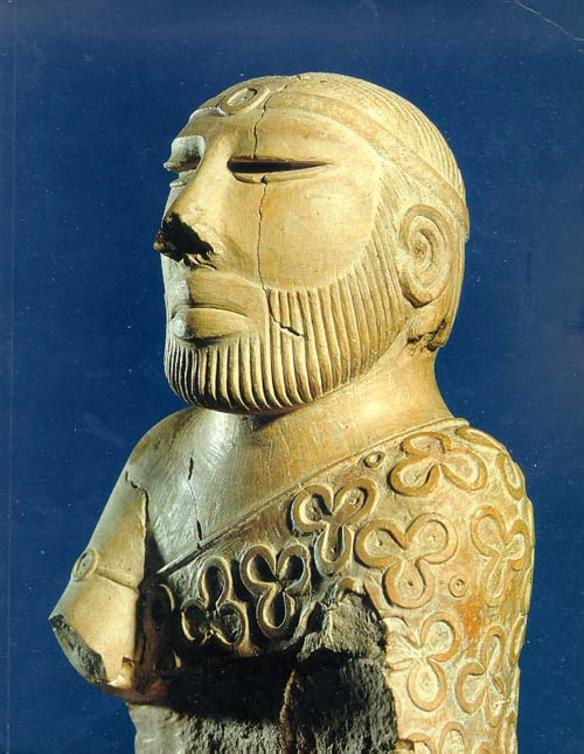
Priest-King, a Harappan artwork, 2400–1900 BC, low fired steatite, National Museum of Pakistan, Karachi

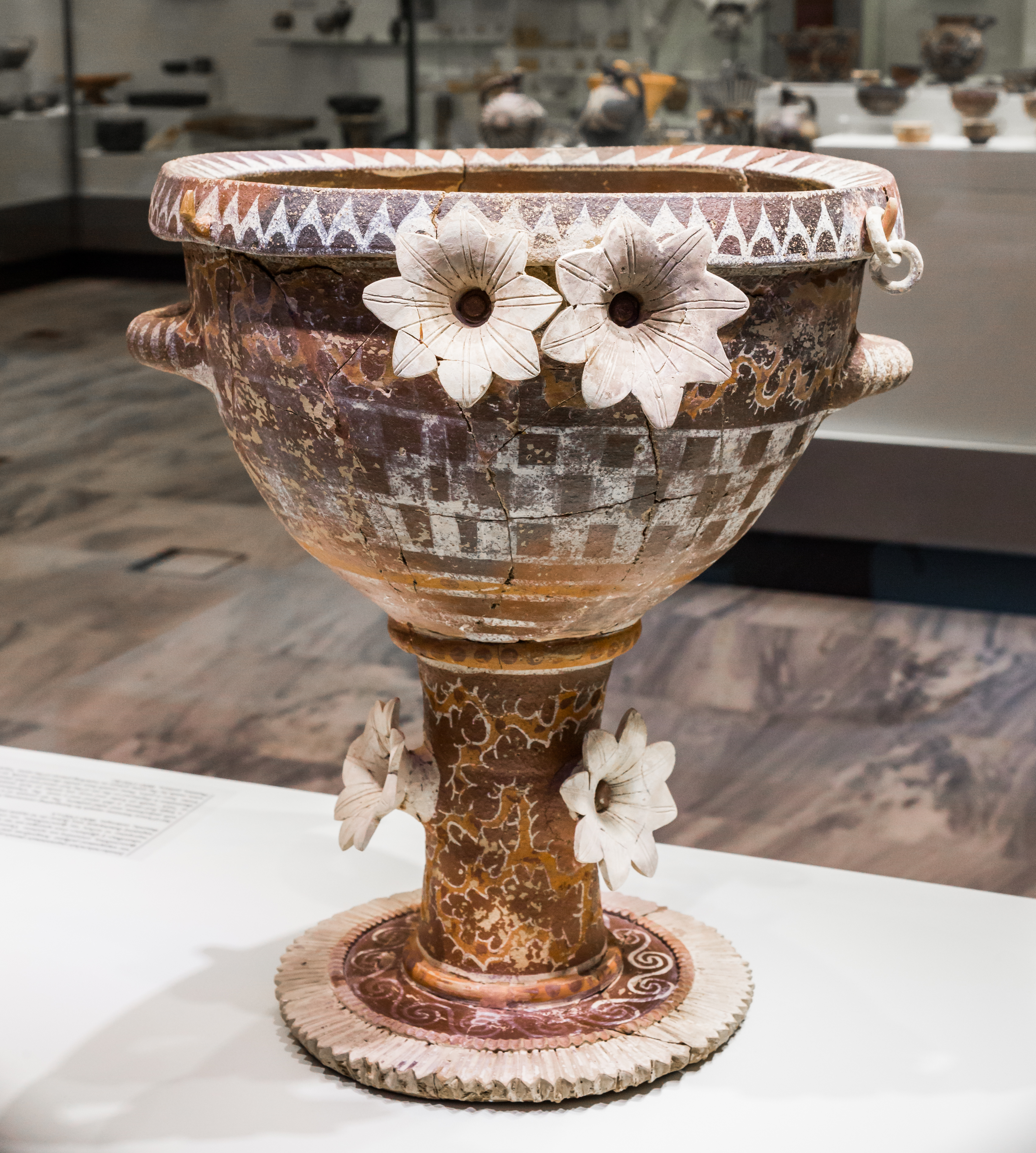
Minoan rosettes on a Kamares krater, 1850-1700 BC, ceramic, Archaeological Museum of Heraklion, Heraklion, Greece

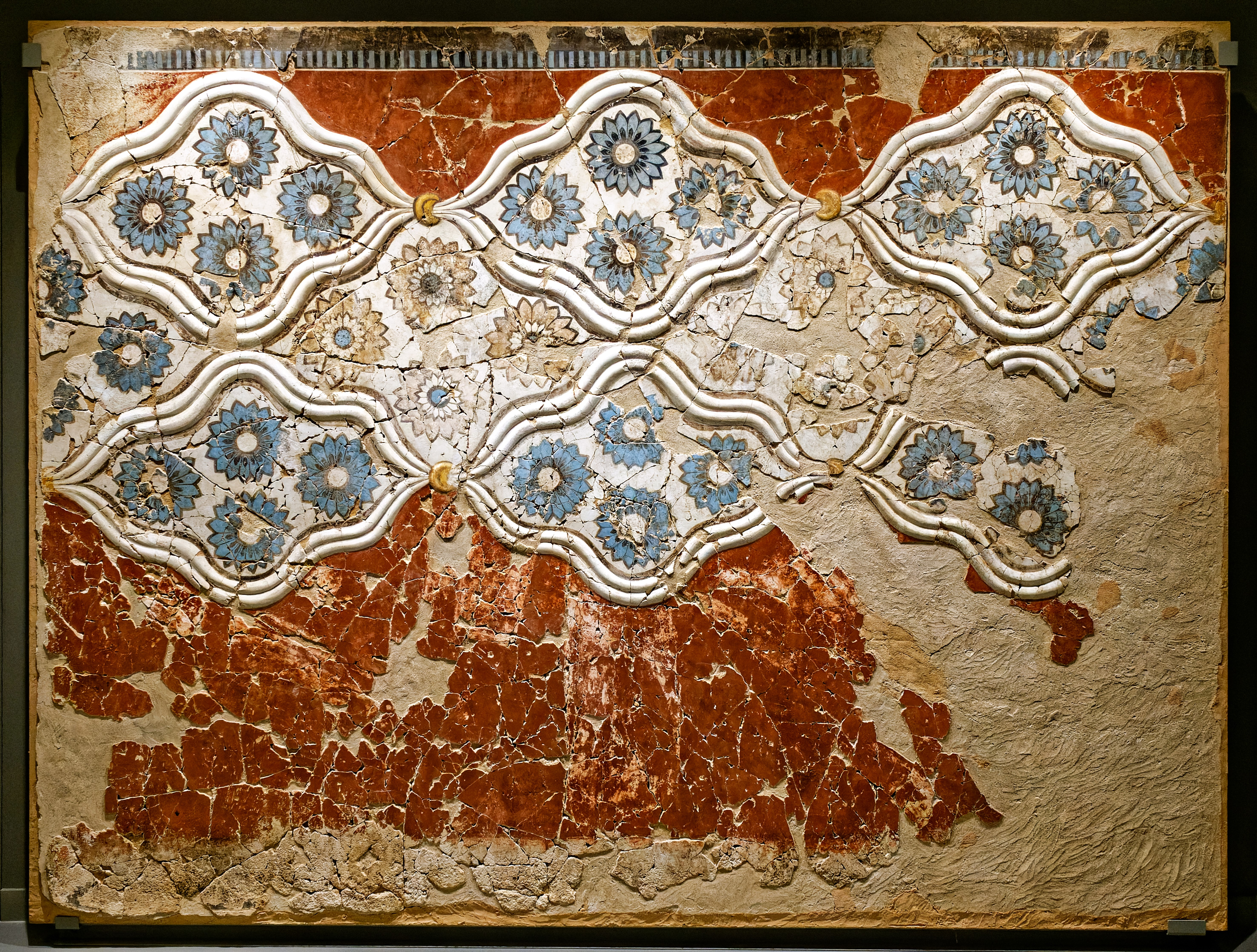
Minoan rosettes on a fresco from Akrotiri, 17th century BC, fresco, Museum of Prehistoric Thera, Thera, Santorini, Greece

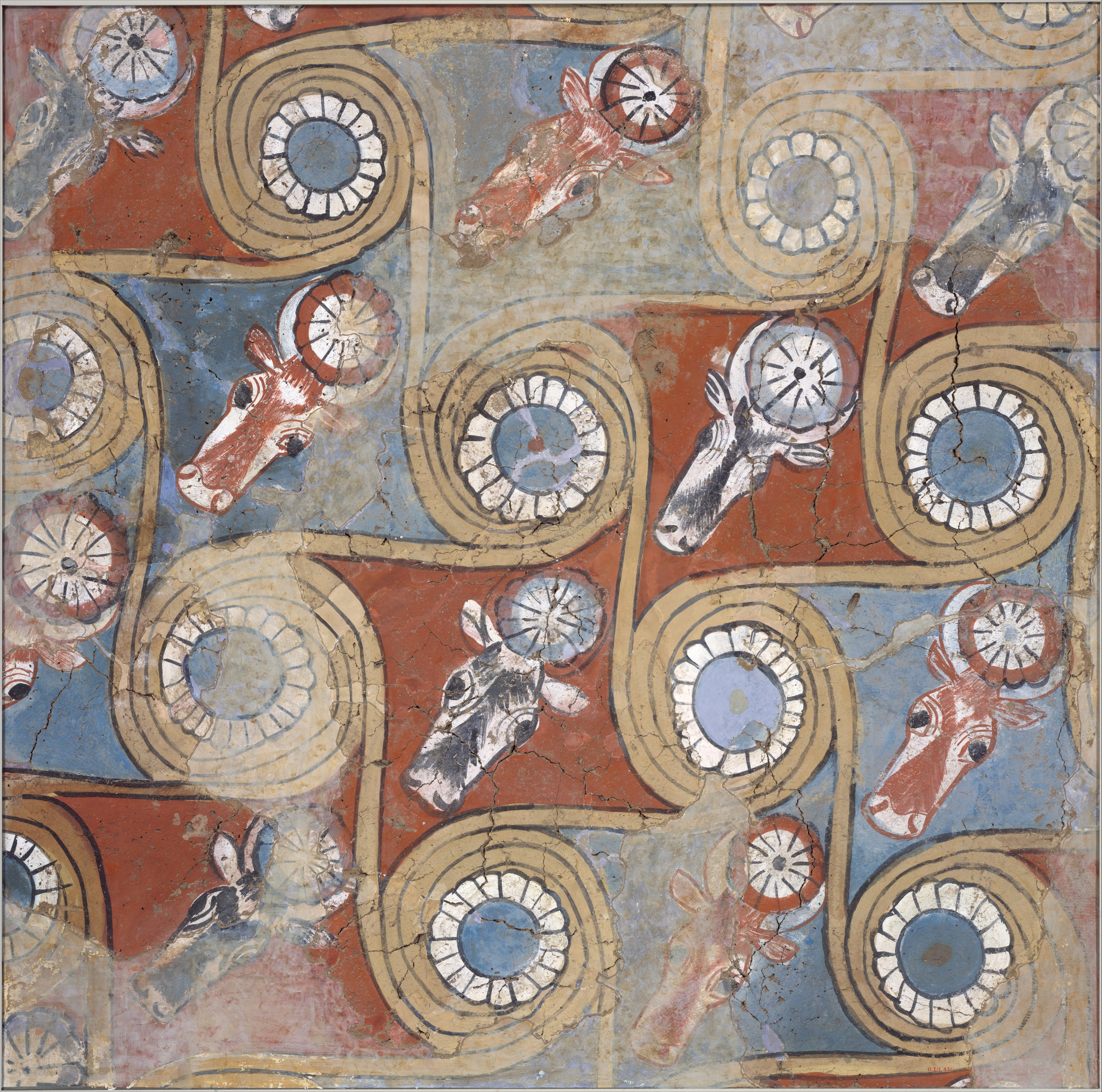
Ancient Egyptian rosettes on a ceiling painting from the palace of Amenhotep III, c.1390–1353 BC, dried mud, mud plaster and paint Gesso, Metropolitan Museum of Art, New York City

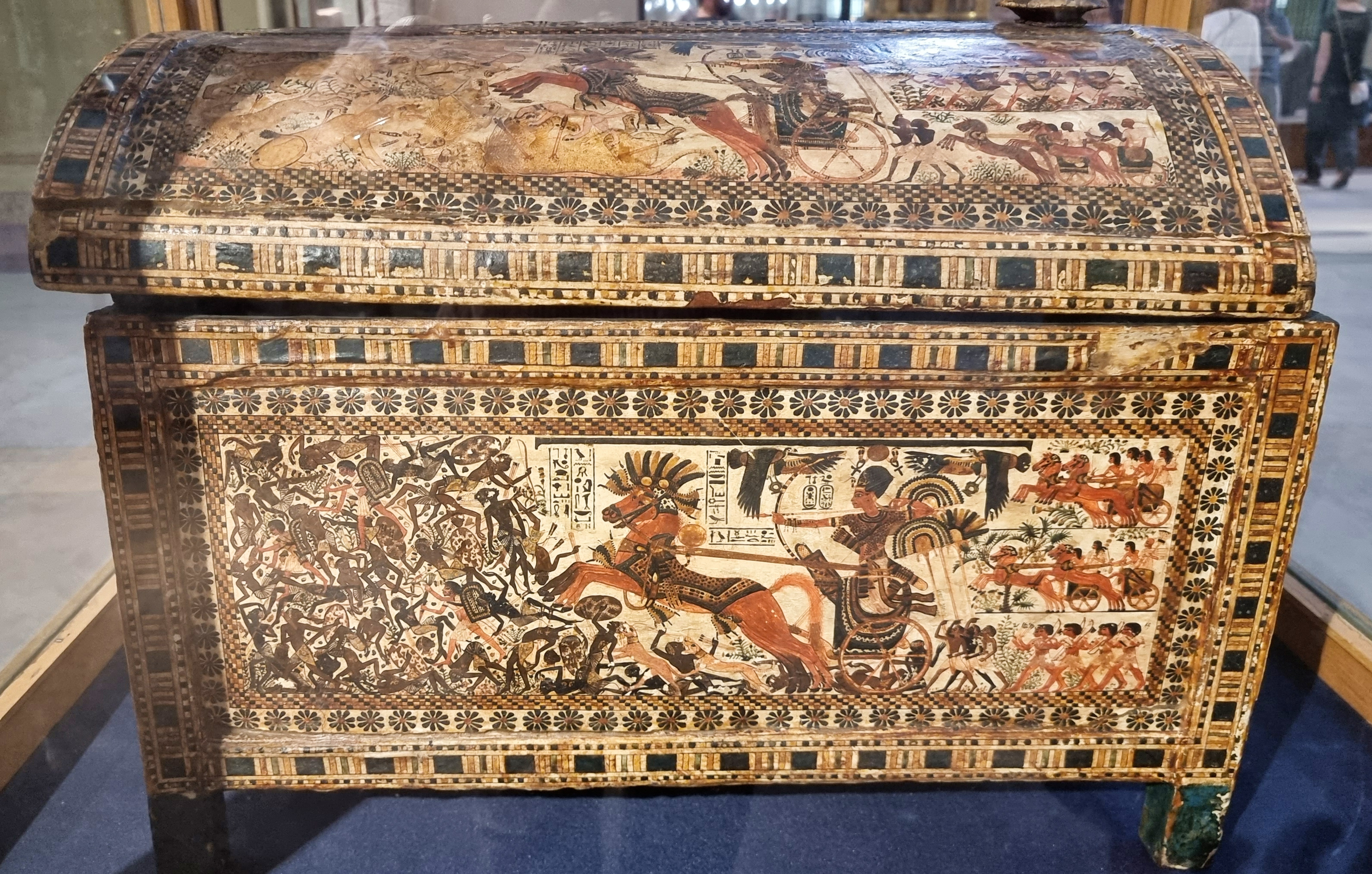
Ancient Egyptian rosettes on the wooden chest of Tutankhamun, 1336-1327 BC, wood inlayed with ivory, Egyptian Museum, Cairo

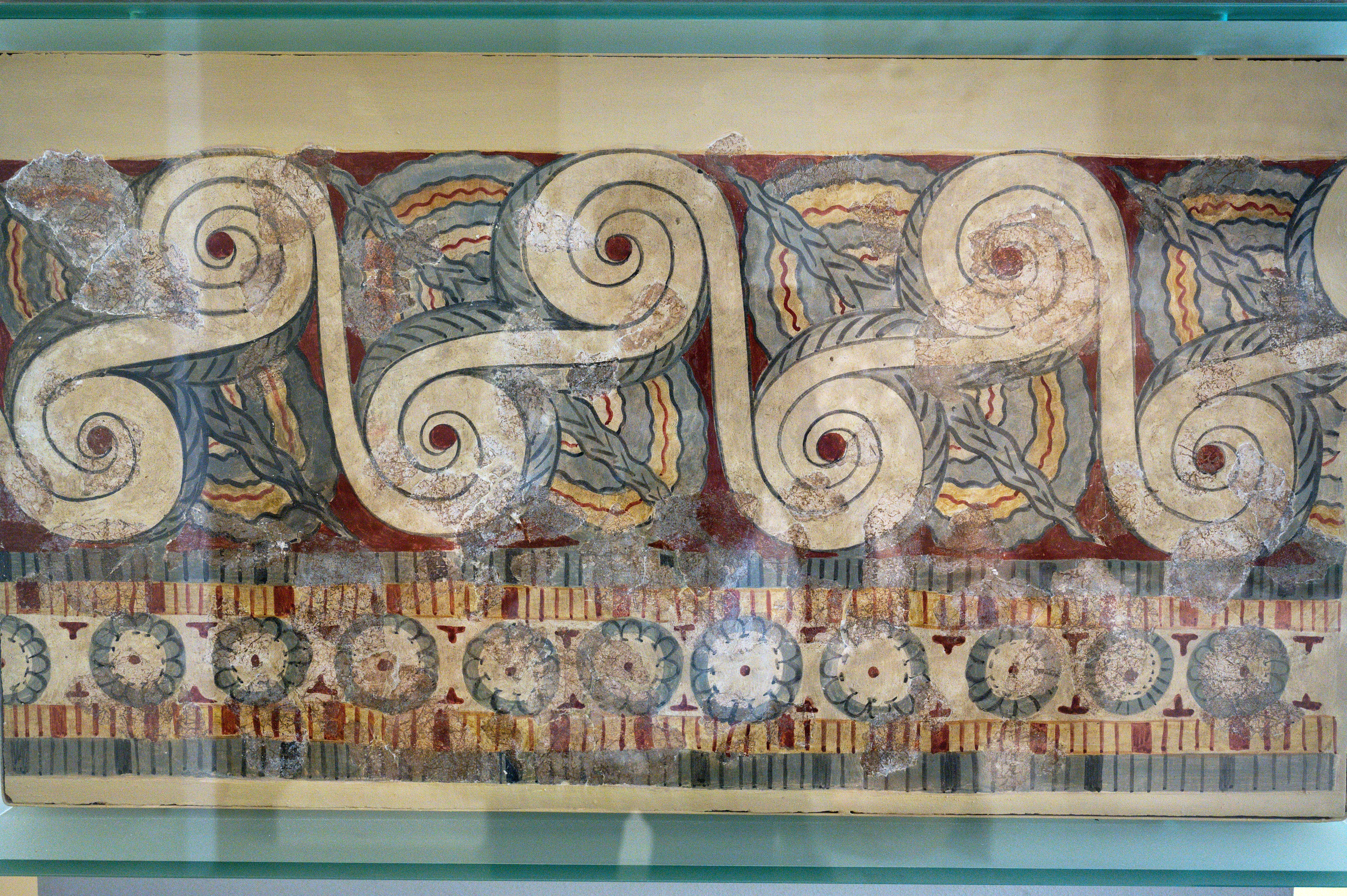
Mycenaean volutes, part of a mural from a palace in Tiryns, Greece, 13th century BC, fresco, Archaeological Museum of Nafplion, Nafplio, Greece

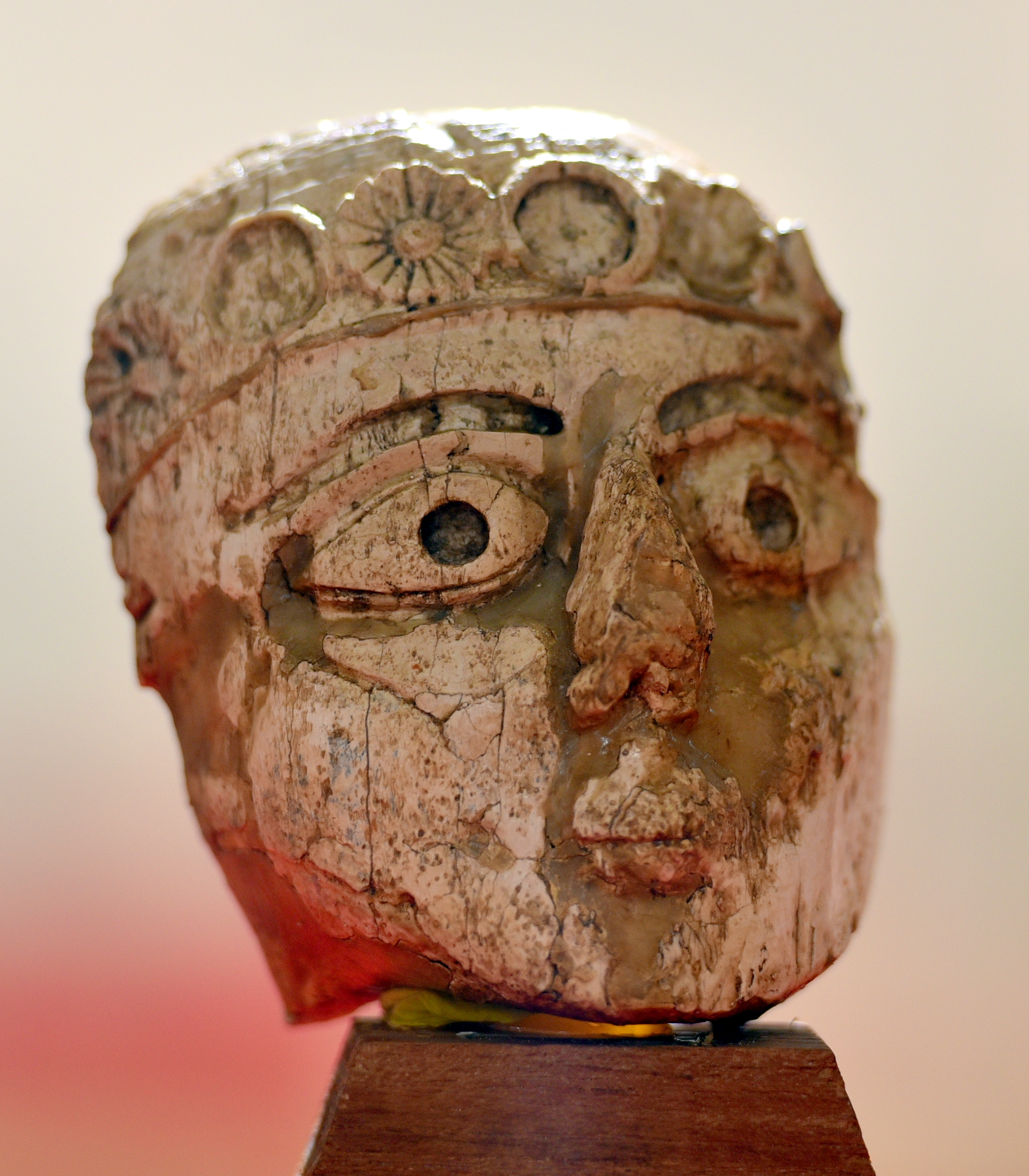
Assyrian rosettes on an ivory piece from Nimrud, 9th to 7th century BC, ivory, Iraq Museum, Baghdad

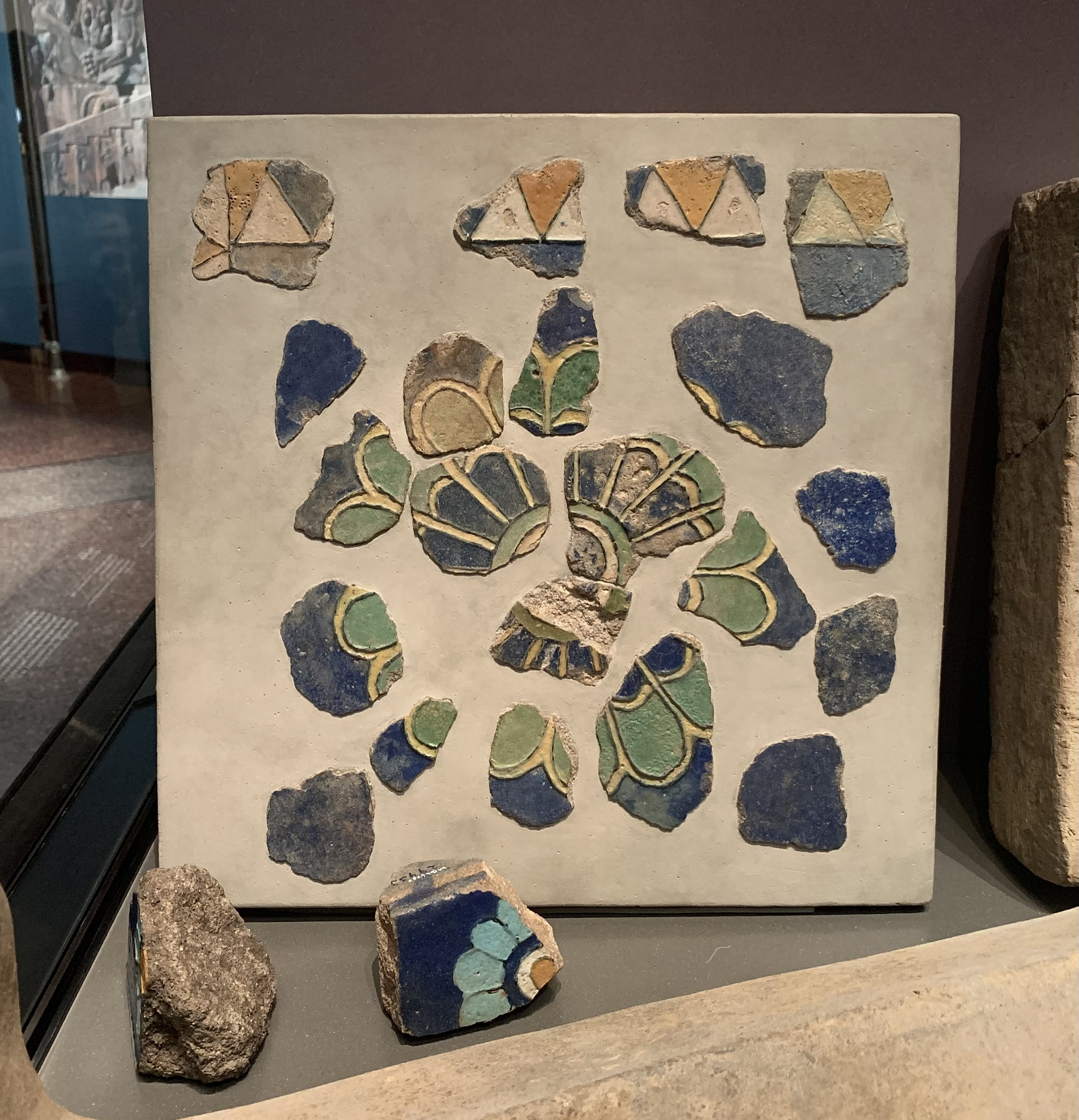
Babylonian glazed brick fragments with rosette decoration, 539-330 BC, burned and glazed clay, Vorderasiatisches Museum Berlin

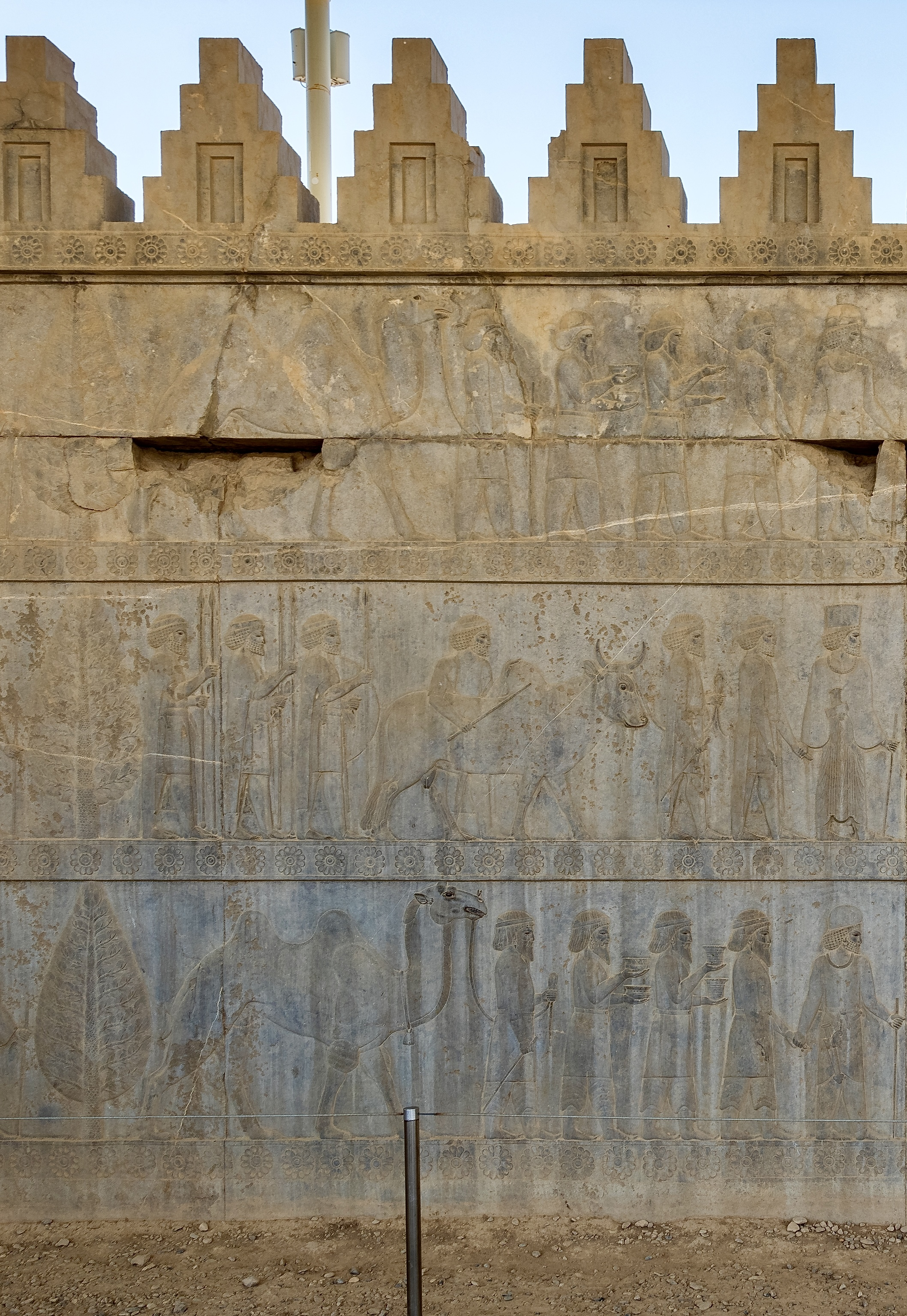
Persian Achaemenid rosette friezes on a wall, c.490 BC, limestone, in situ, Persepolis, Iran

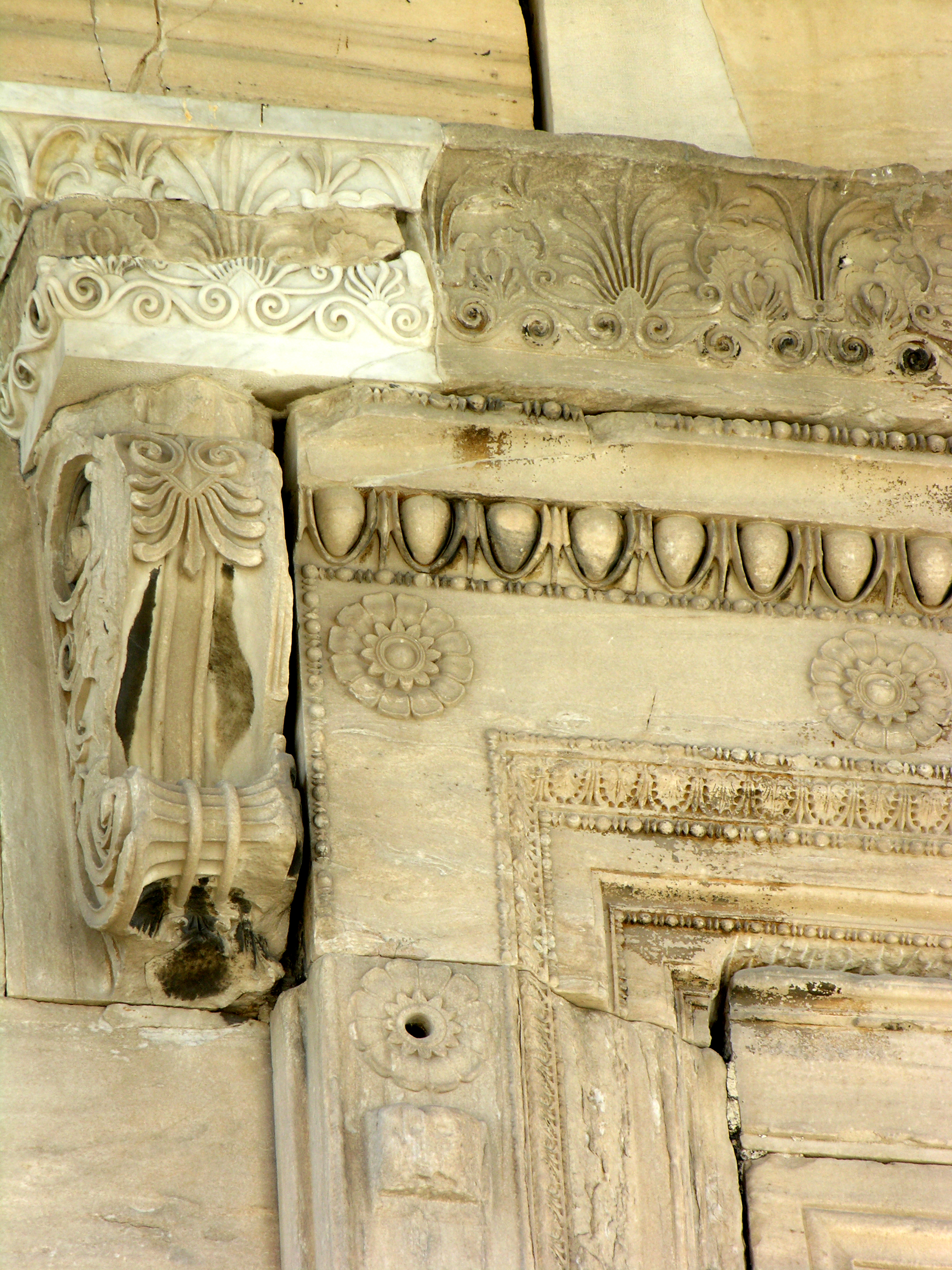
Ancient Greek rosettes around a door of the Erechtheion, Athens, Greece, unknown architect, 421-405 BC

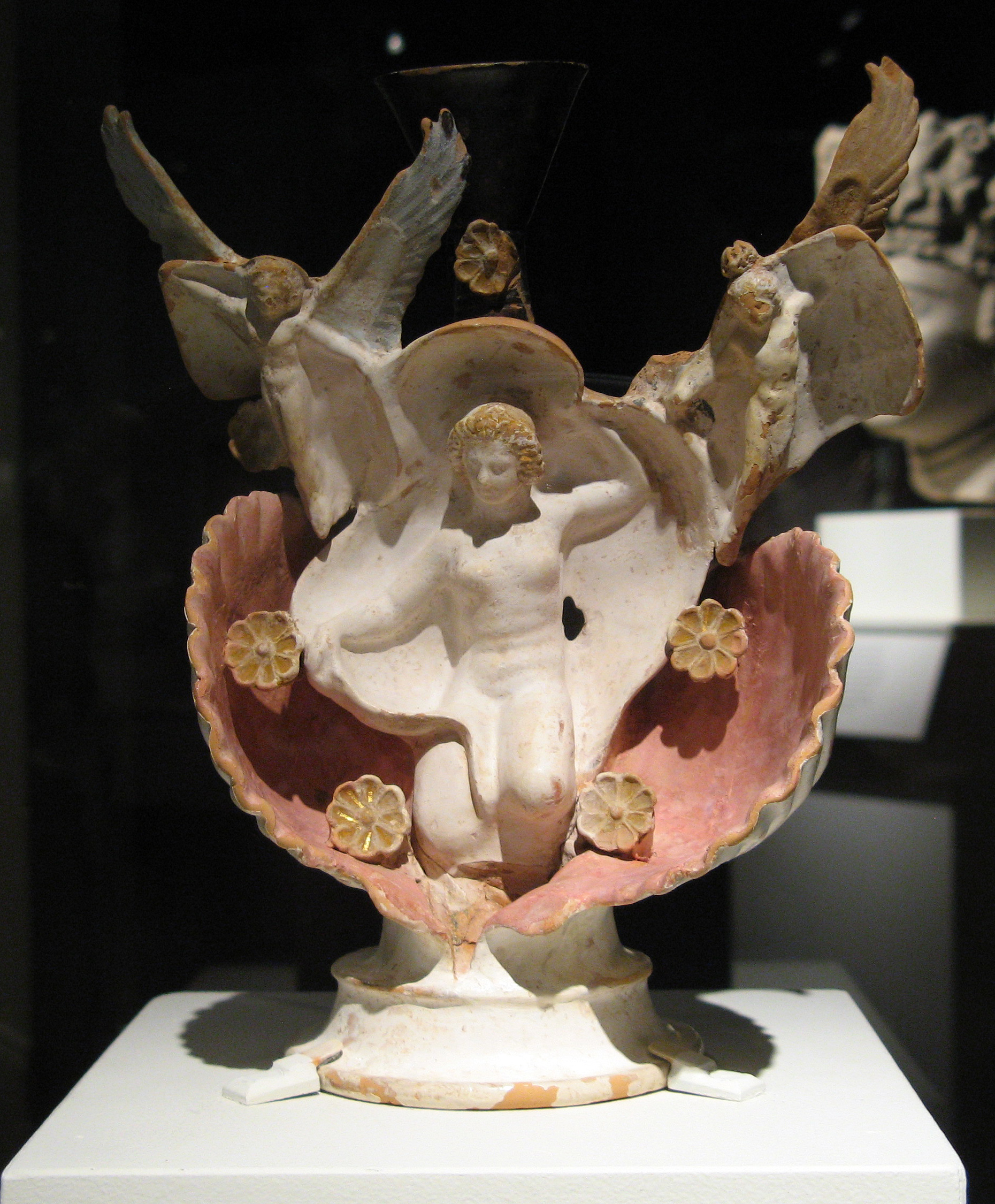
Ancient Greek rosettes on a lekythos with Aphrodite rising from the sea, 4th century BC, ceramic, Museum of Fine Arts, Boston, US

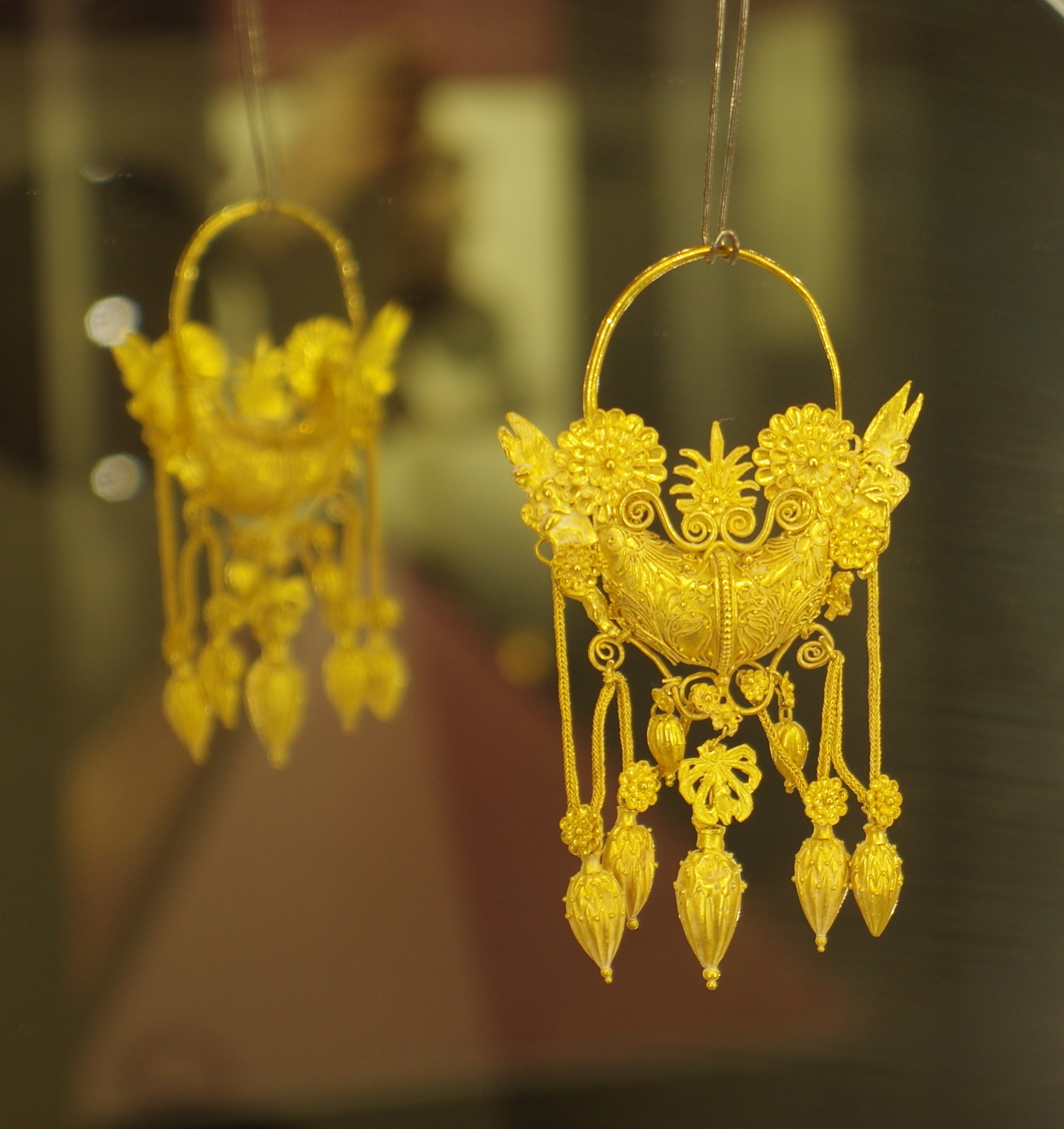
Ancient Greek rosettes on a pendant, 4th century BC, gold, National Archaeological Museum of Taranto, Taranto, Italy

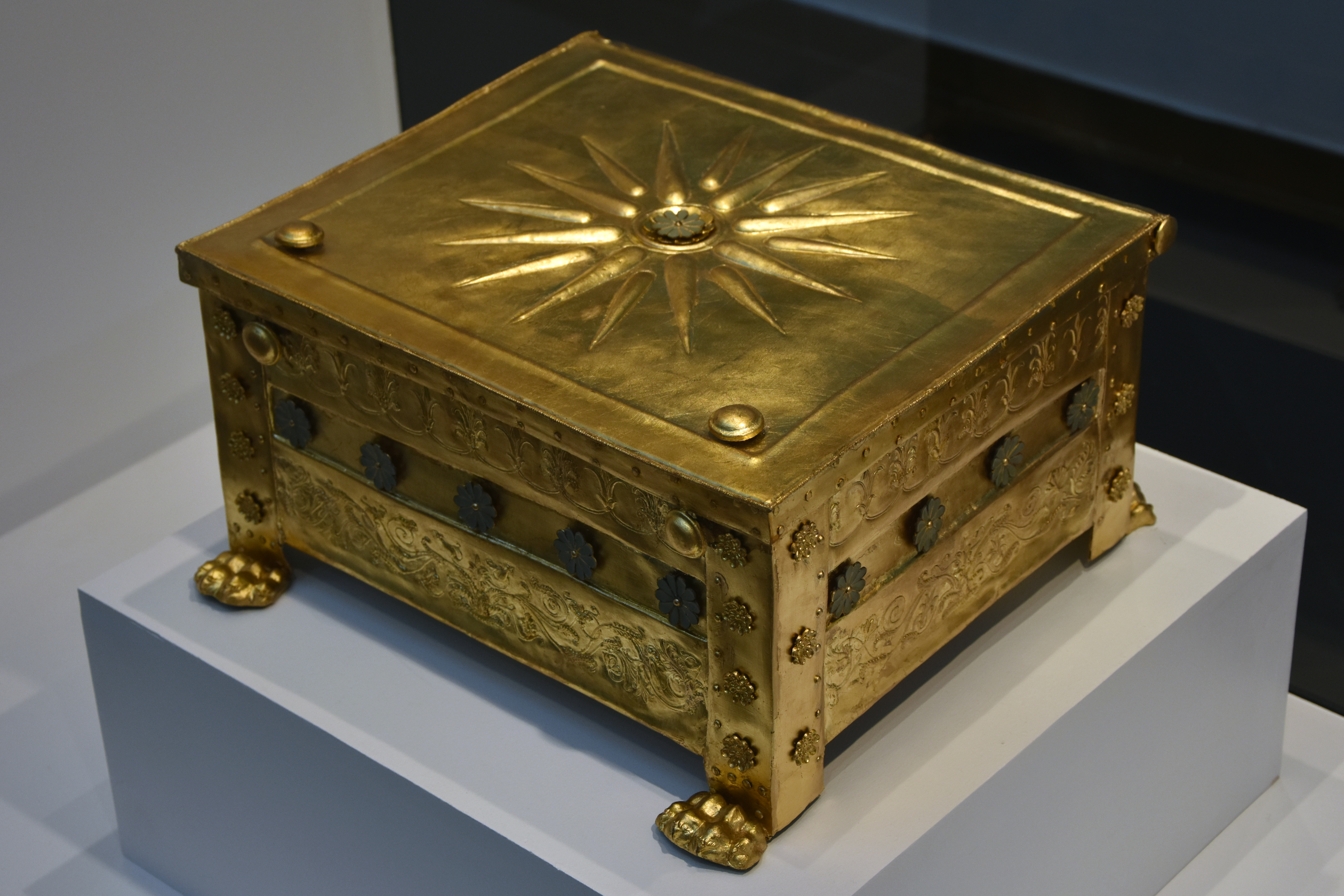
Ancient Greek rosettes on a larnax of Philip II, 330-320 BC, gold and enamel, Museum of the Royal Tombs of Aigai, Vergina, Greece

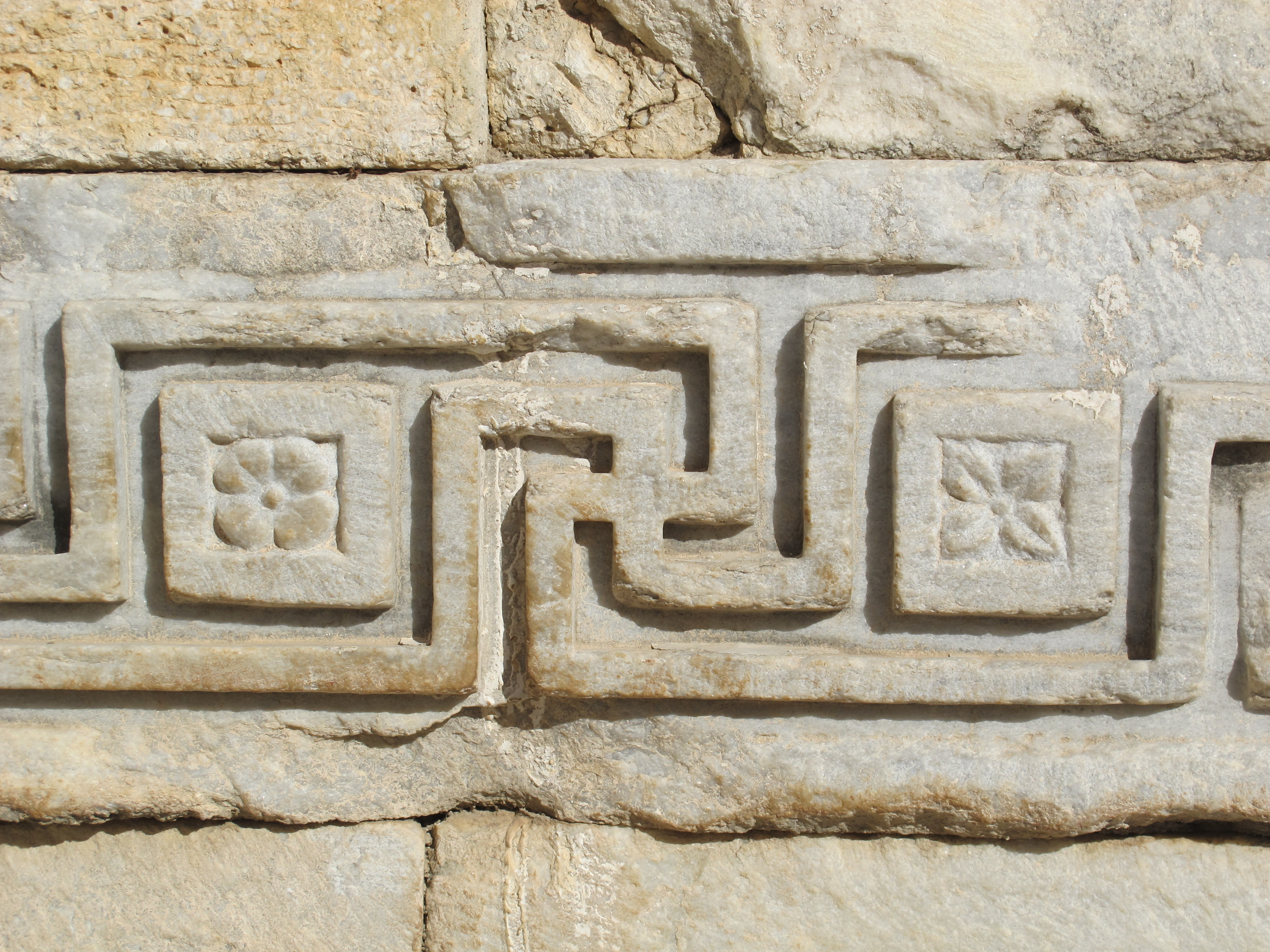
Roman meander with rosettes on the Temple of Hadrianus, Ephesus, Turkey, unknown architect or sculptor, 117-118 AD

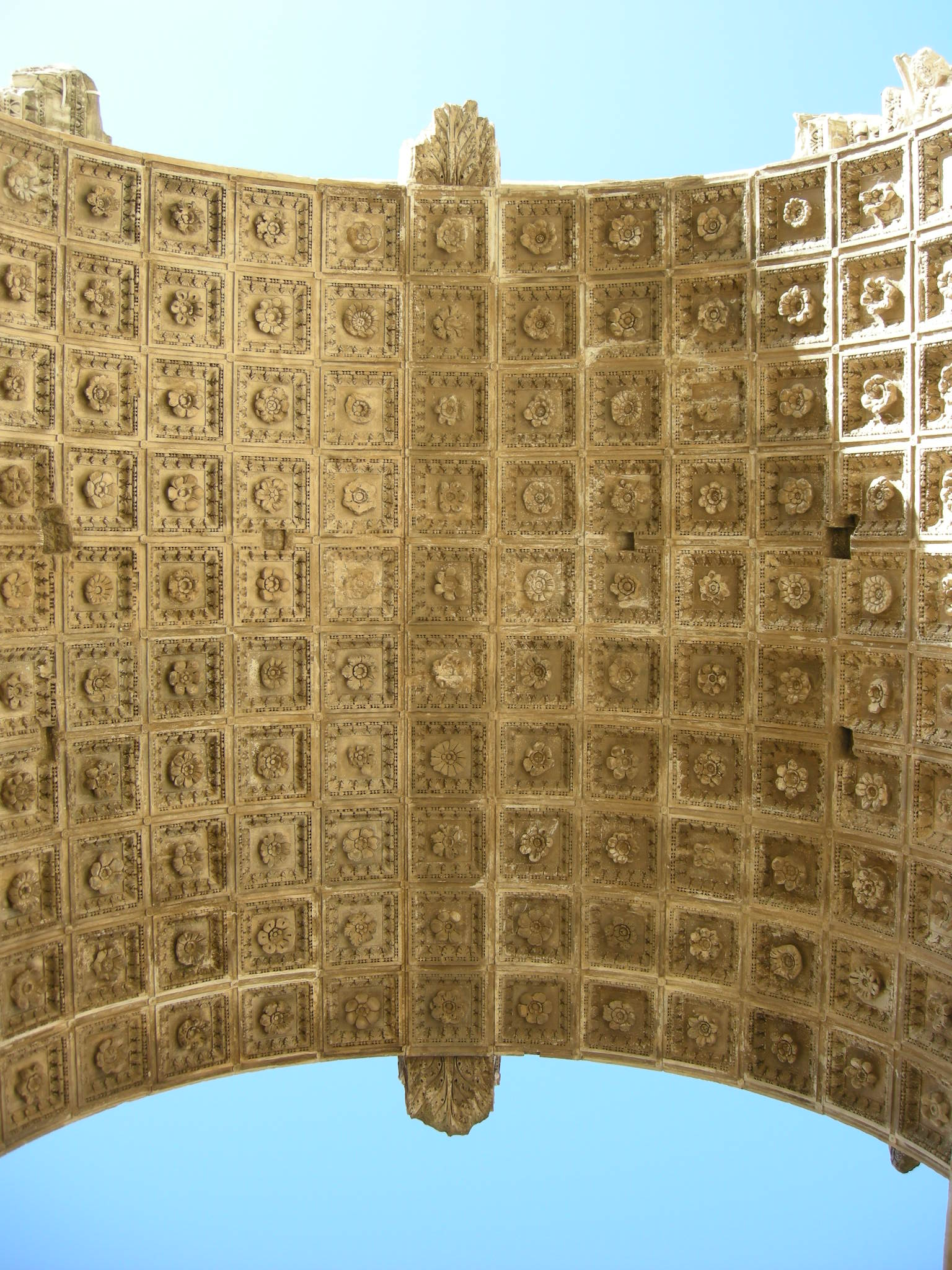
Roman rosettes in the ceiling of the Arch of Septimius Severus, Rome, unknown architect, 203

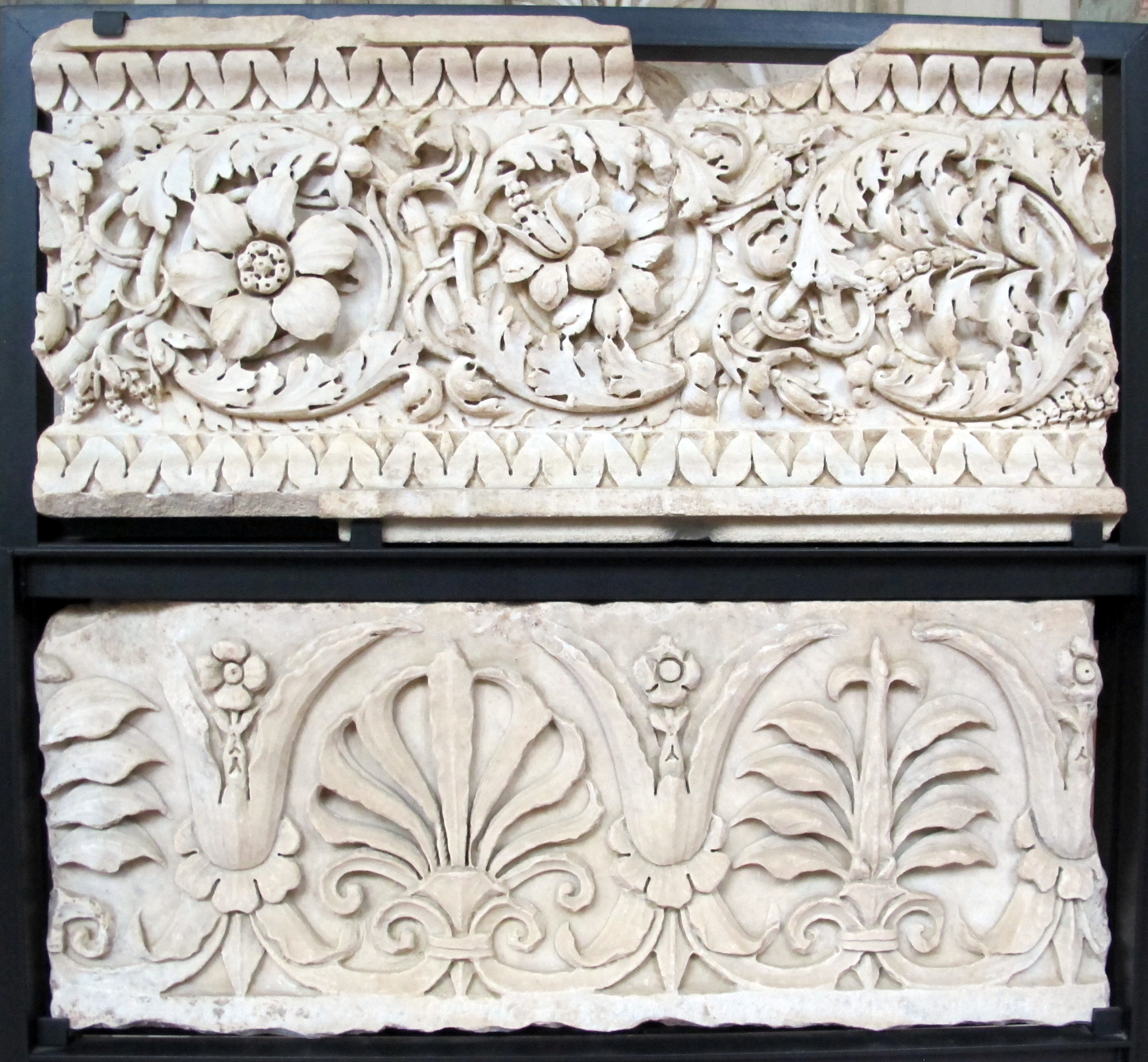
Roman rosettes on a frieze, unknown date, probably marble, Villa medicea di Cerreto Guidi, Cerreto Guidi, Italy

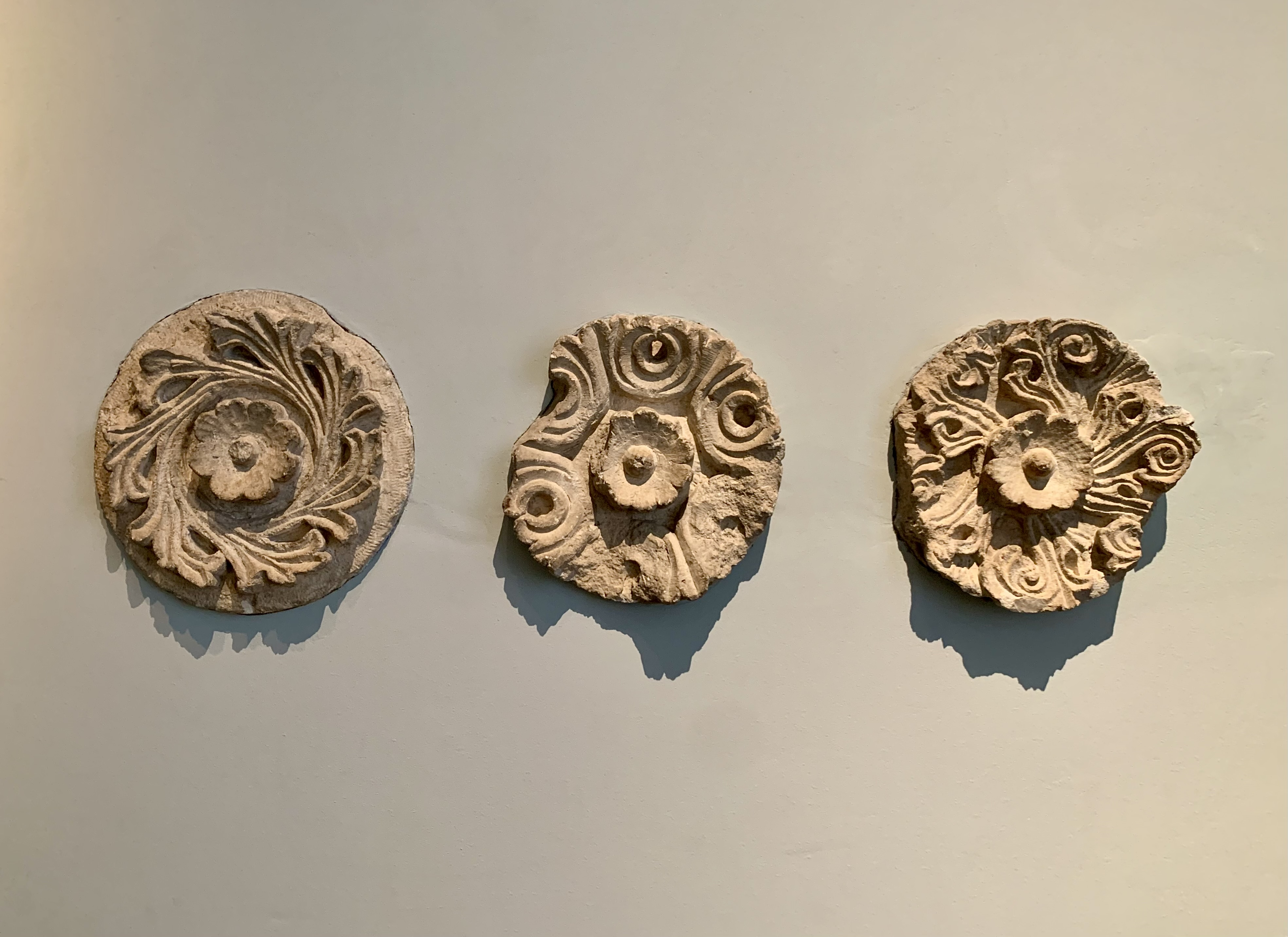
Islamic keystones with rosettes, c.705-715, limestone, Pergamon Museum, Berlin

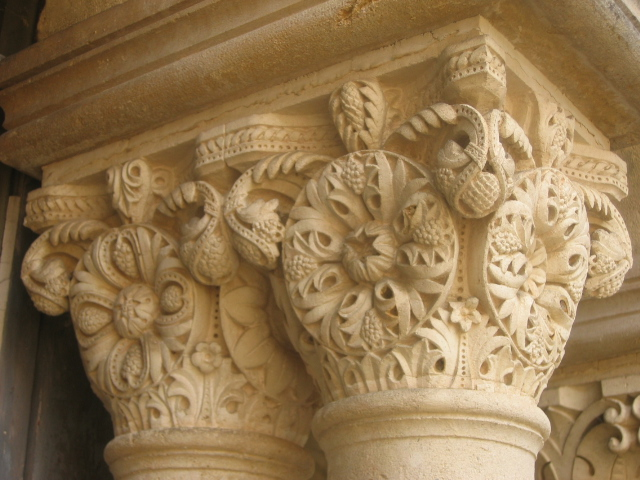
Romanesque rosettes on a pair of capitals from the Vézelay Abbey, Vézelay, France, unknown architect, 1120–1150

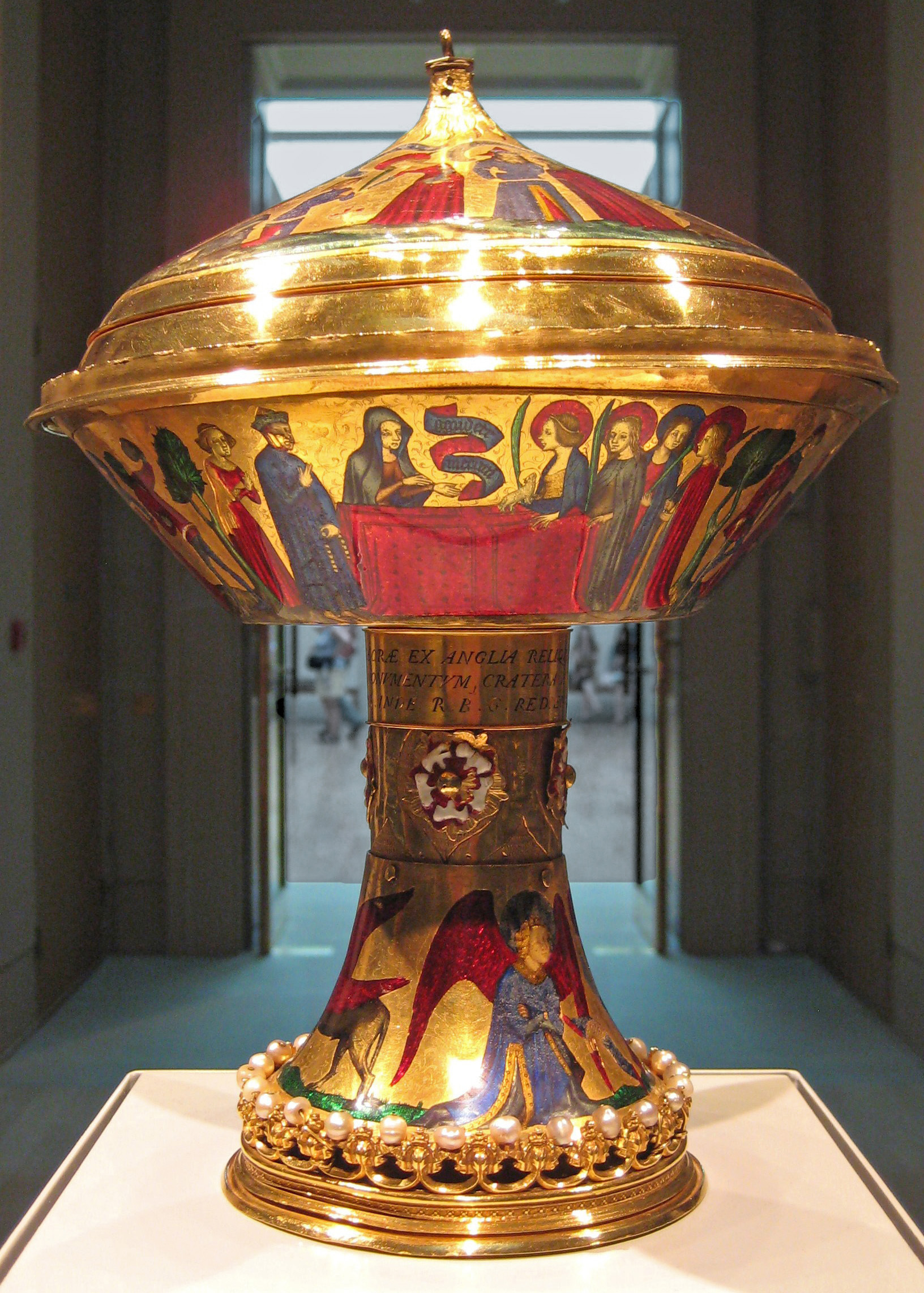
Tudor rose added under Henry VIII to the foot of the Gothic Royal Gold Cup, late 14th century, British Museum

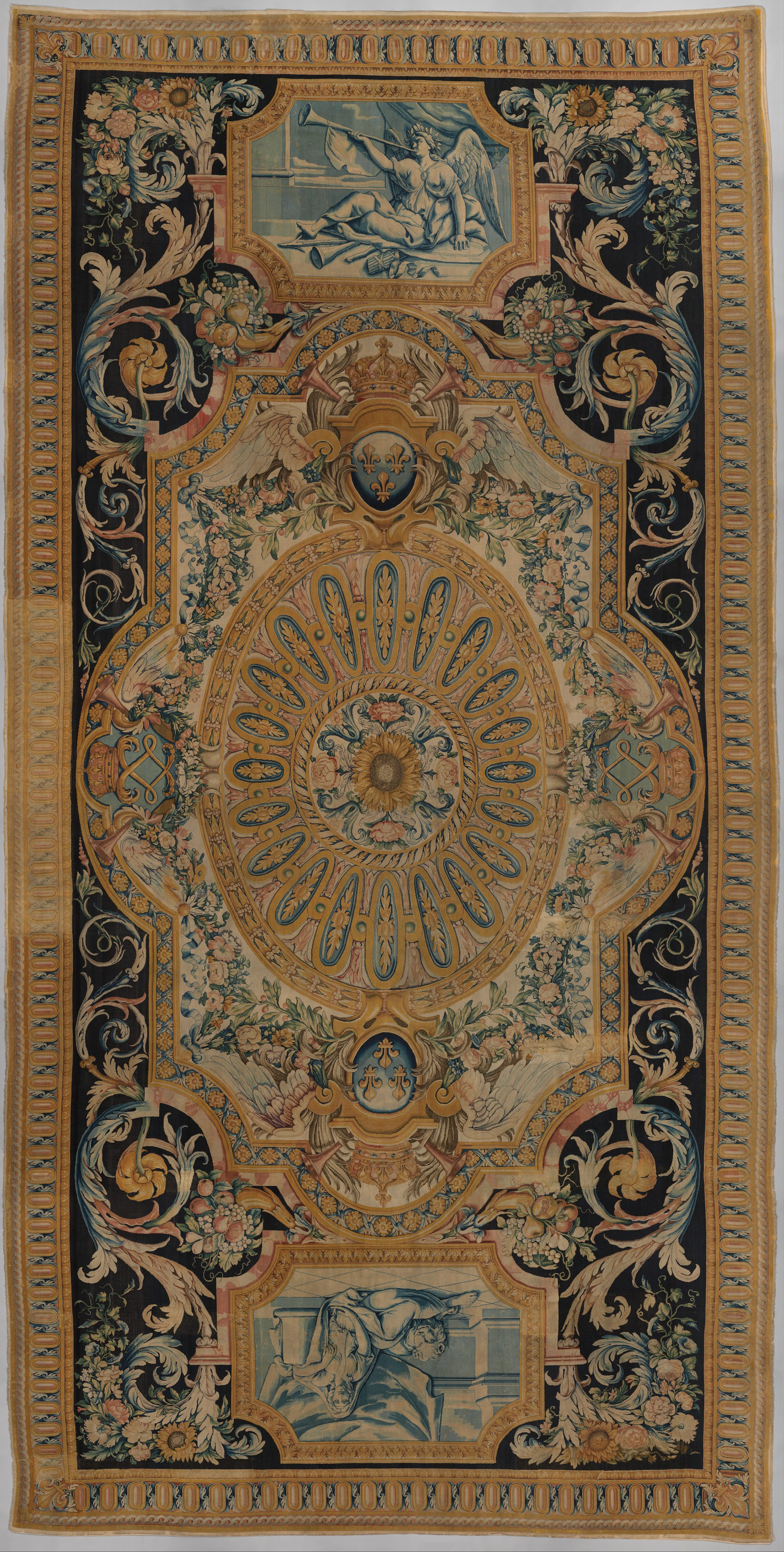
Baroque rosettes on a carpet with fame and fortitude, by the Savonnerie manufactory, 1668–1685, knotted and cut wool pile, woven with about 90 knots per square inch, Metropolitan Museum of Art

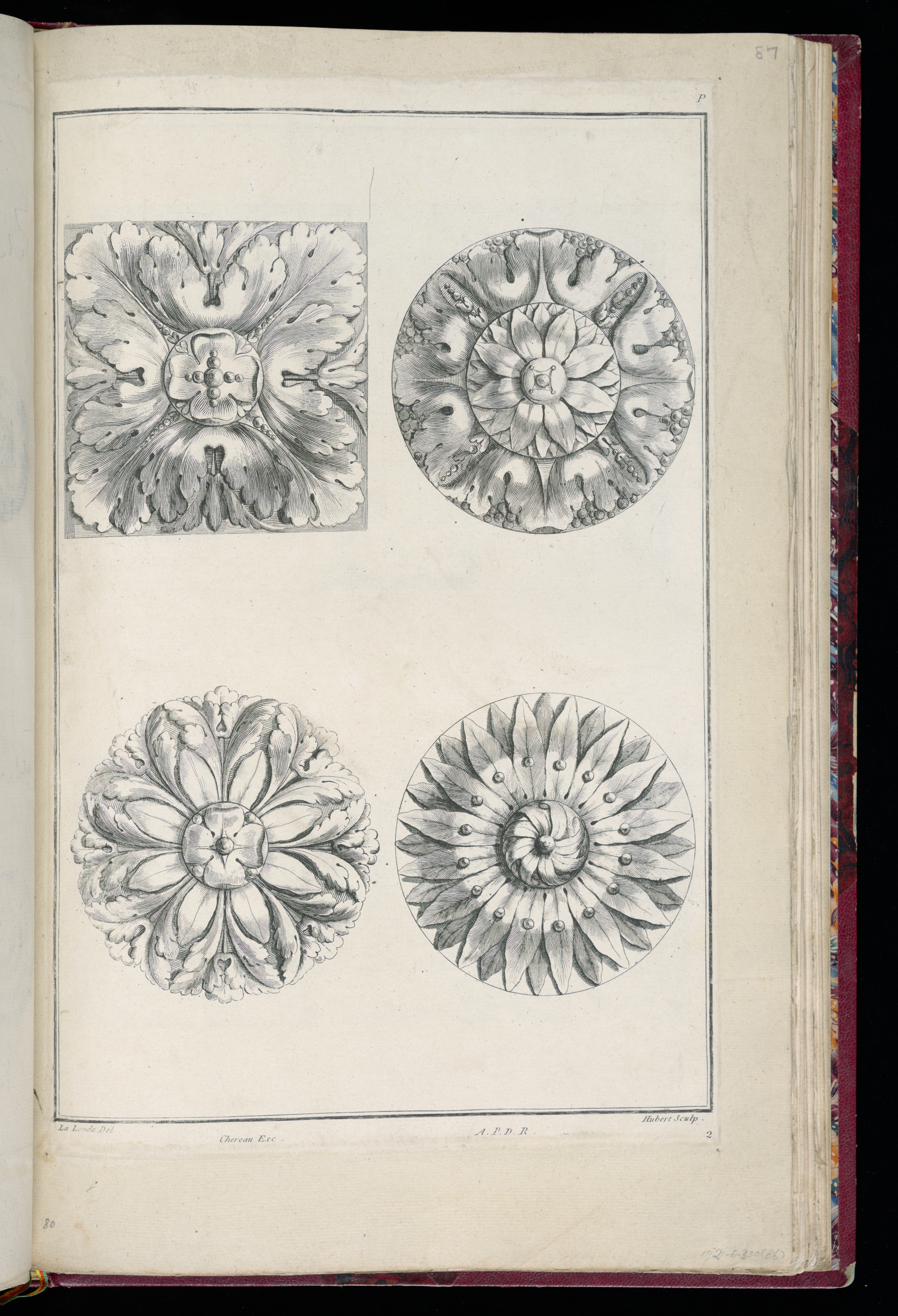
Rosettes, 17th or 18th centuries, print, Cooper Hewitt, Smithsonian Design Museum, New York City

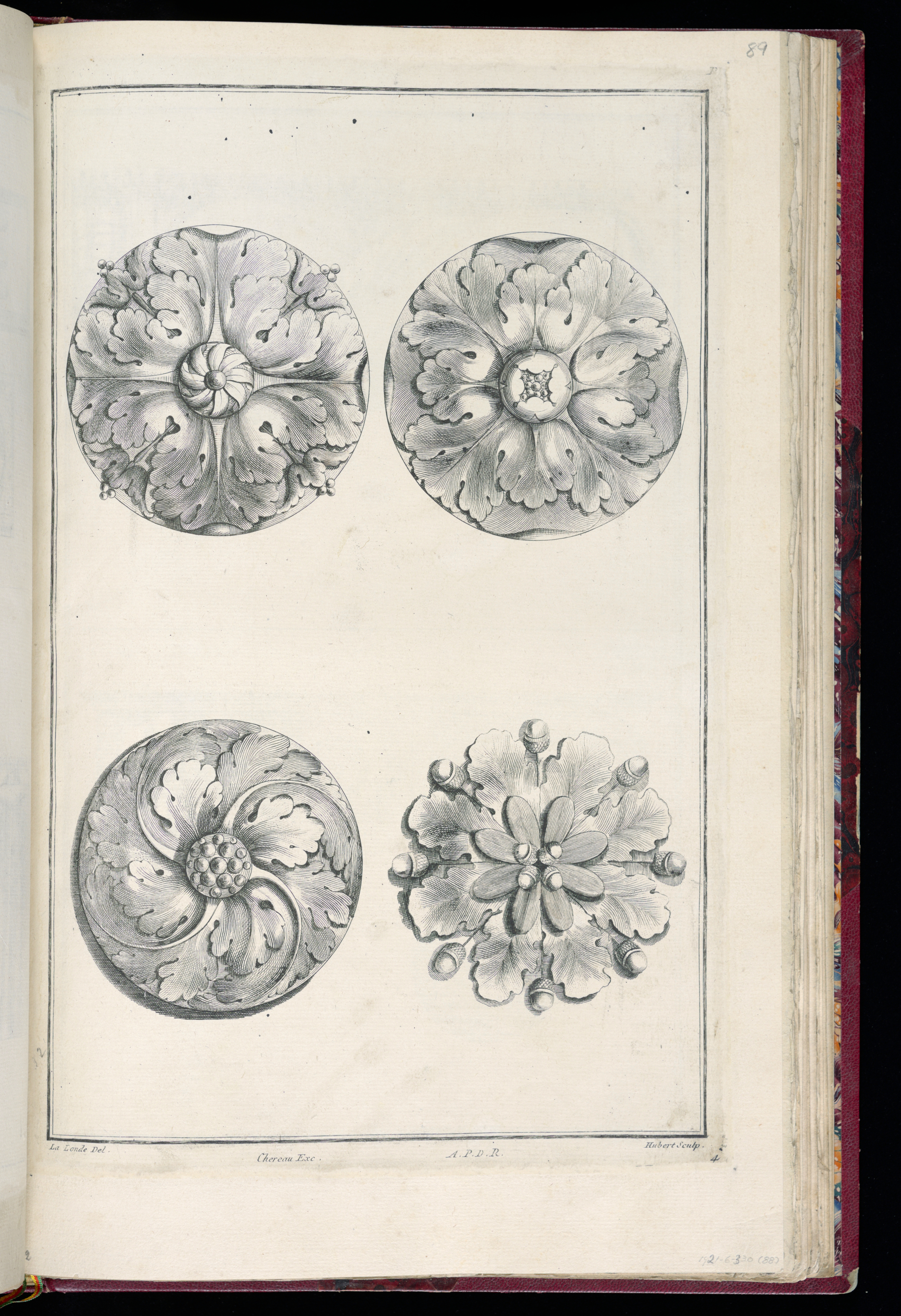
Rosettes, 17th or 18th centuries, print, Cooper Hewitt, Smithsonian Design Museum

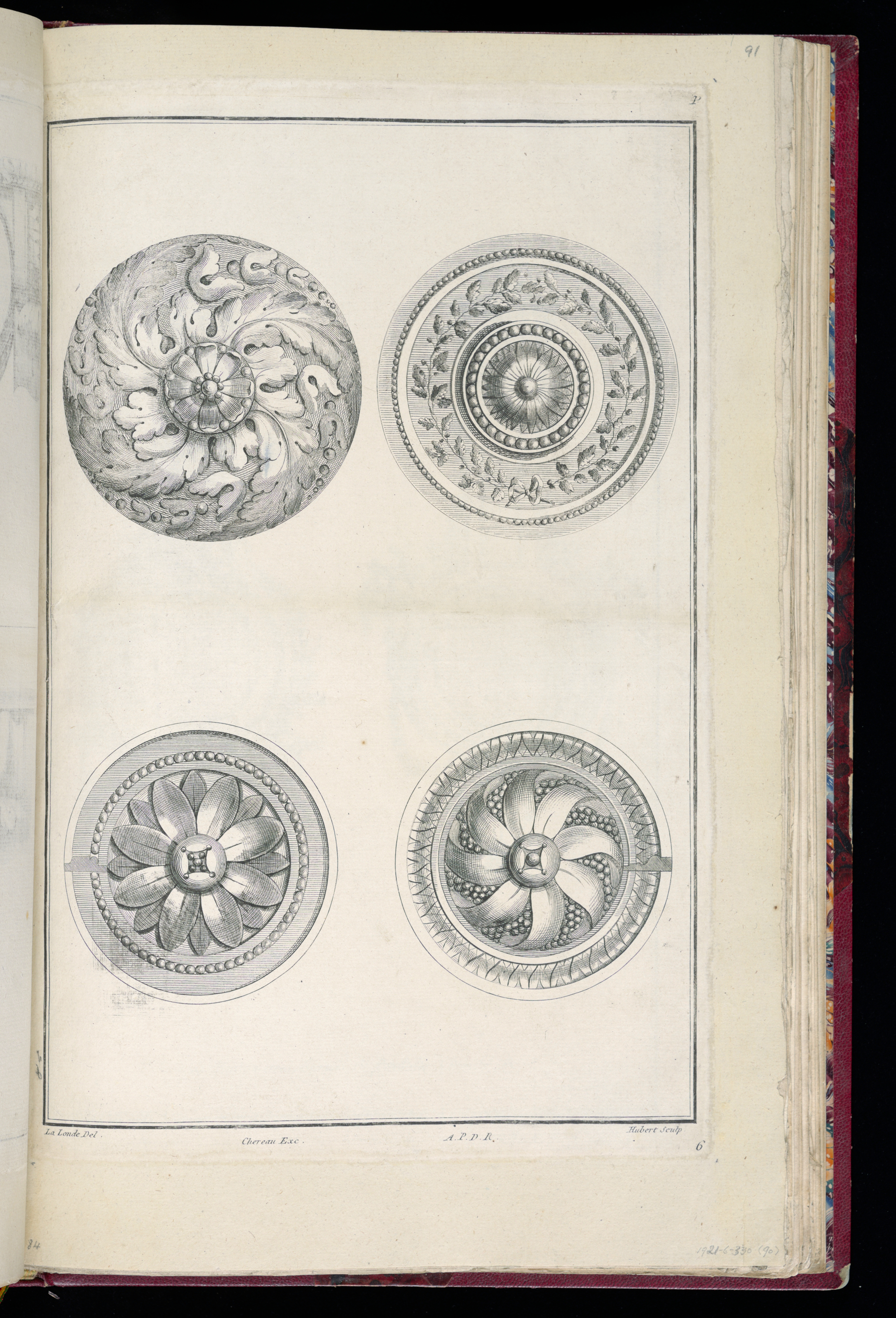
Rosettes, 17th or 18th centuries, print, Cooper Hewitt, Smithsonian Design Museum

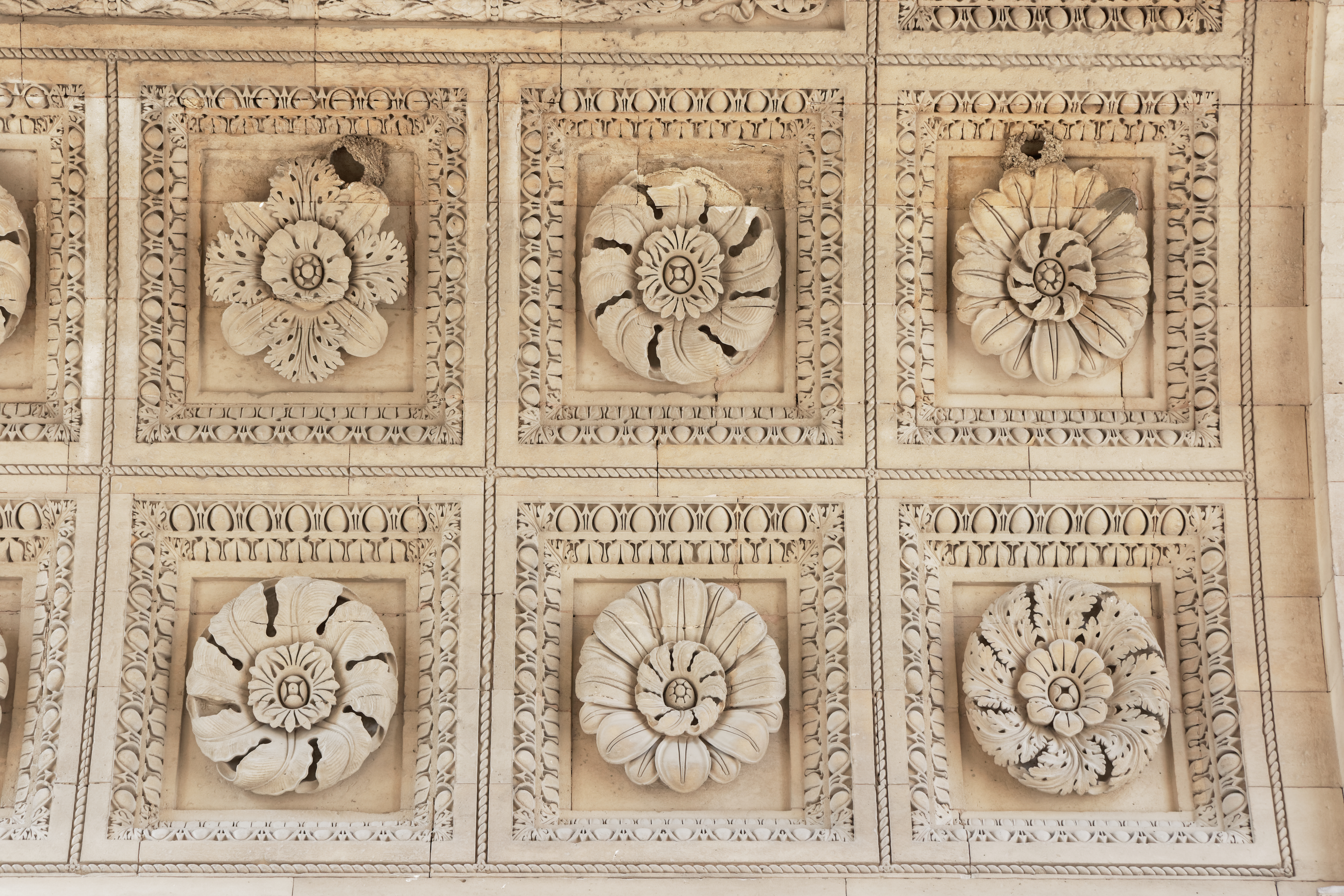
Neoclassical rosettes in the Arc de Triomphe du Carrousel, Paris, by Charles Percier and Pierre-François-Léonard Fontaine, 1806–1808

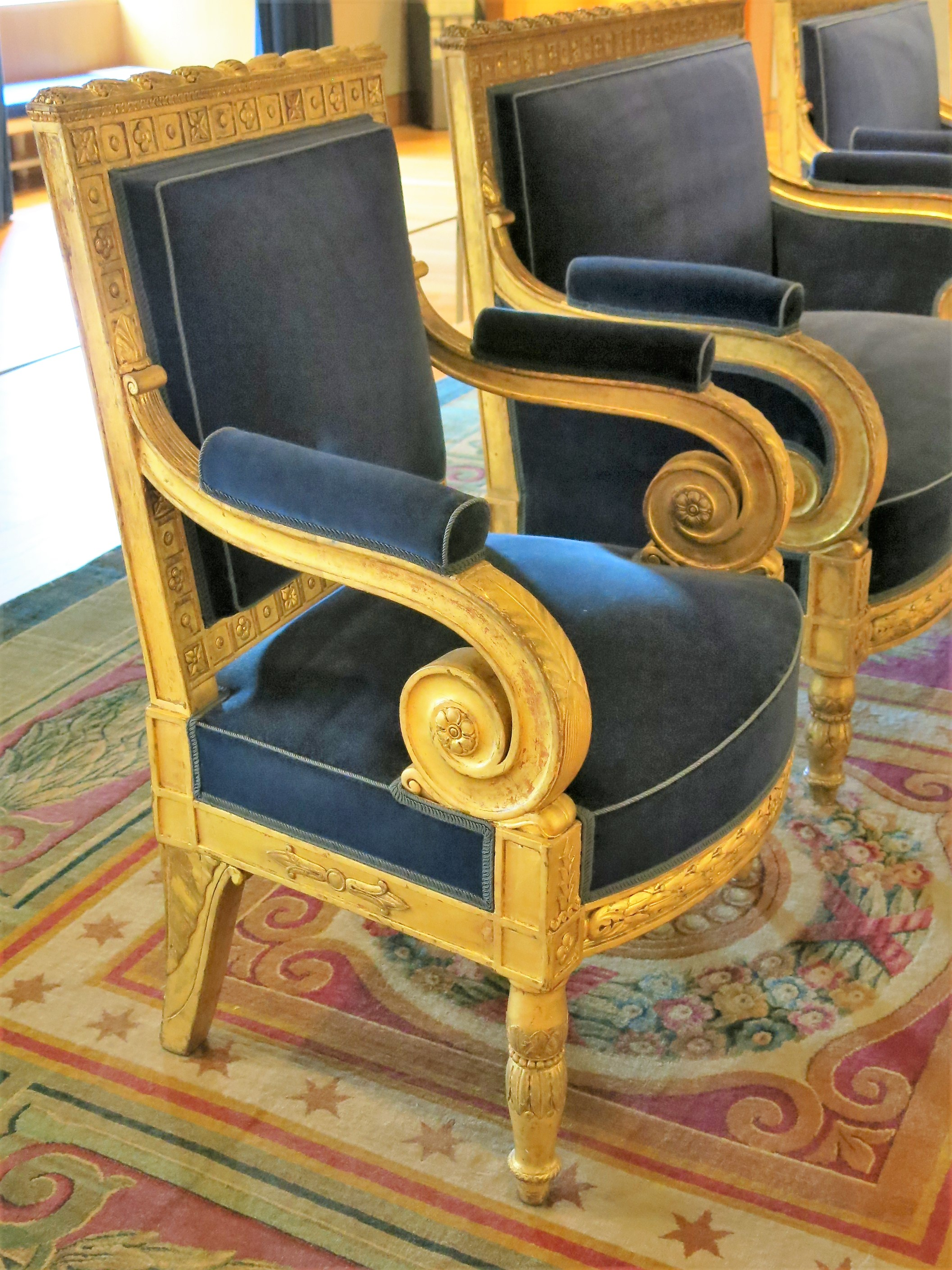
Neoclassical rosettes on the arms of an armchair, by Jacob Desmalter, 1808, gilded wood, Louvre

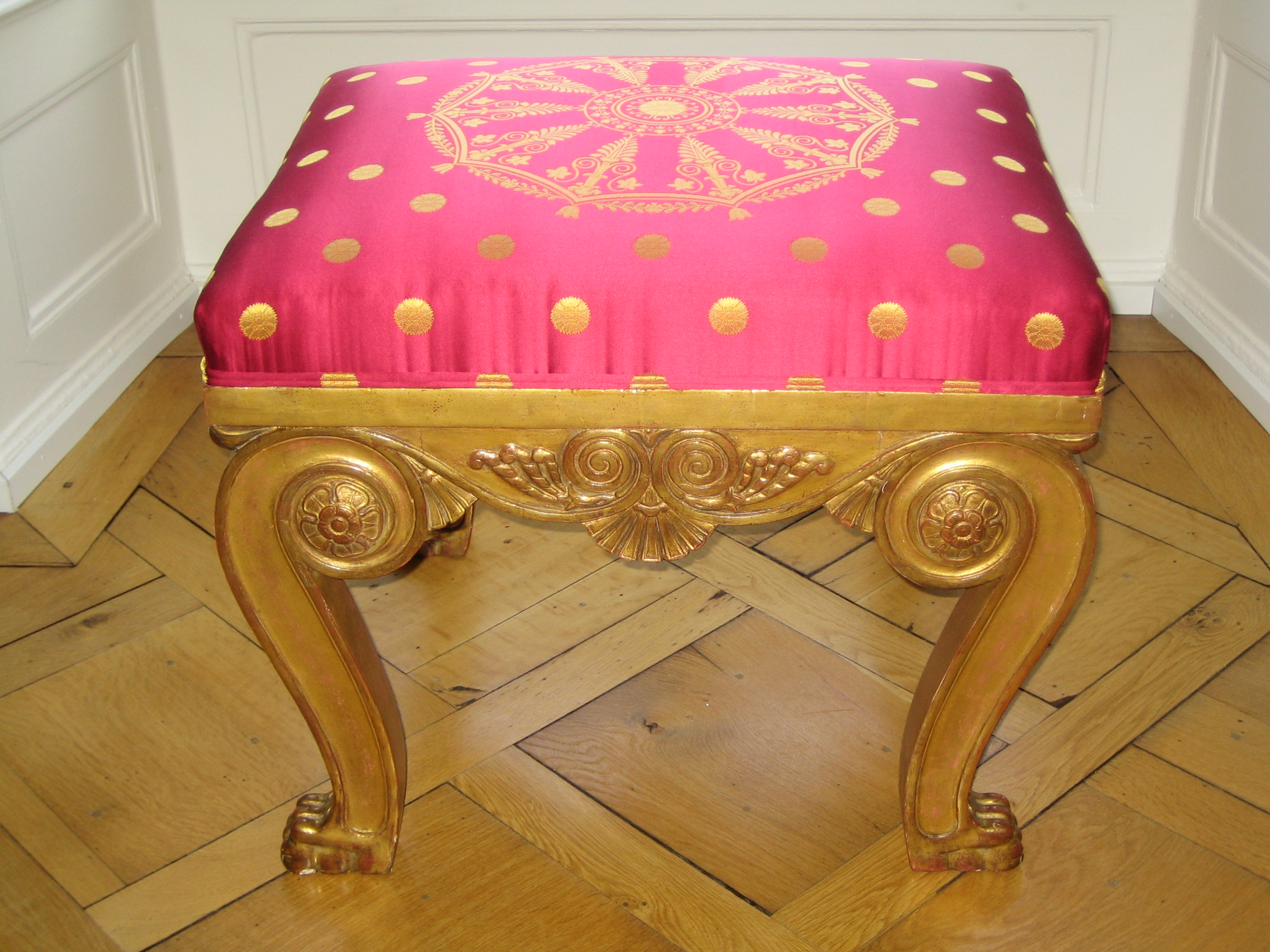
Neoclassical rosettes on a stool, by François-Honoré-Georges Jacob-Desmalter, c.1810, gilded wood, unknown location

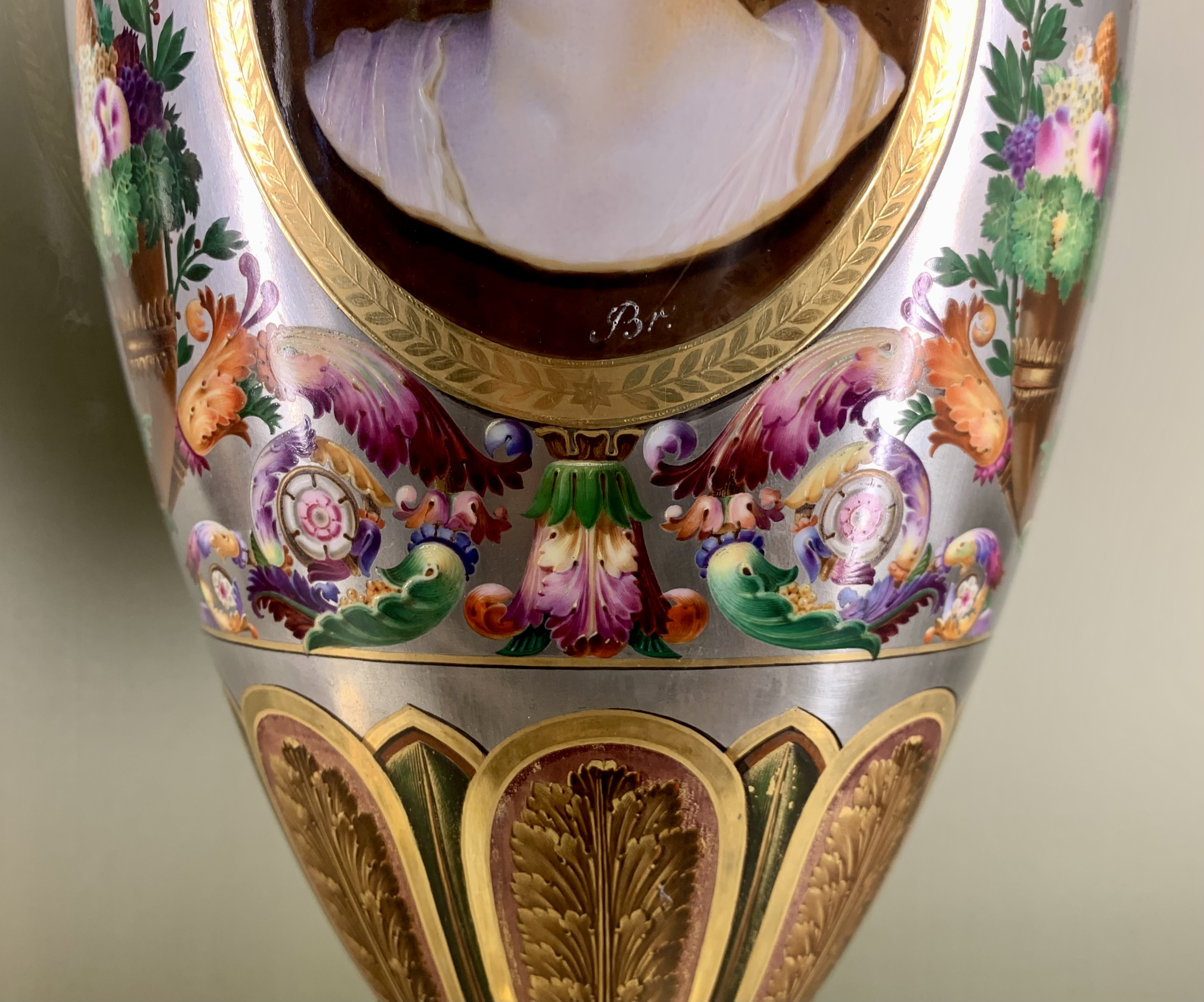
Neoclassical rosettes on a vase, by the Sèvres Porcelain Manufactory, 1814, hard-paste porcelain with platinum background and gilt bronze mounts, Louvre

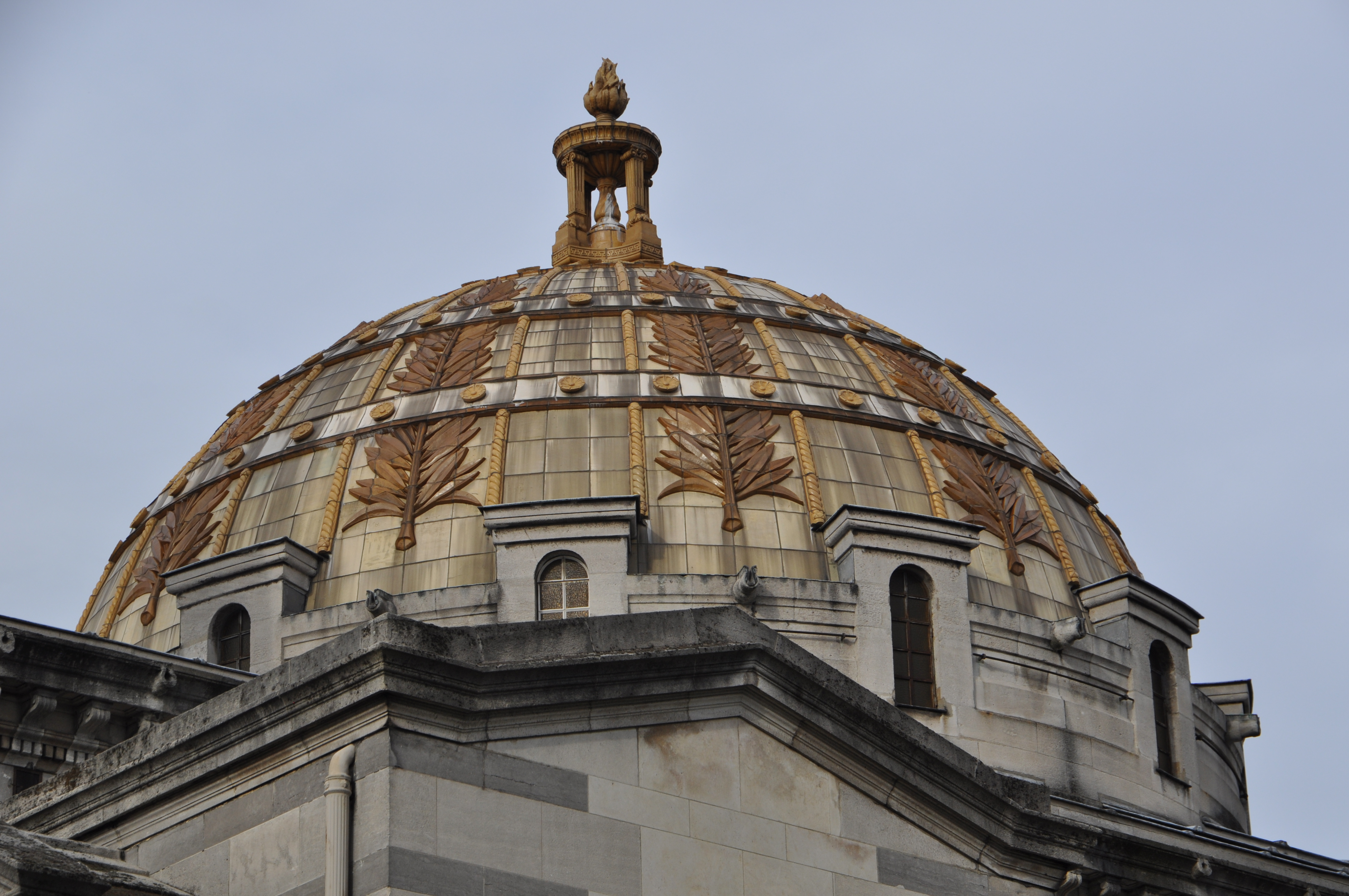
Neoclassical rosettes on the dome of the Crematorium of the Père-Lachaise Cemetery, Paris, by Jean Camille Formigé, 1886

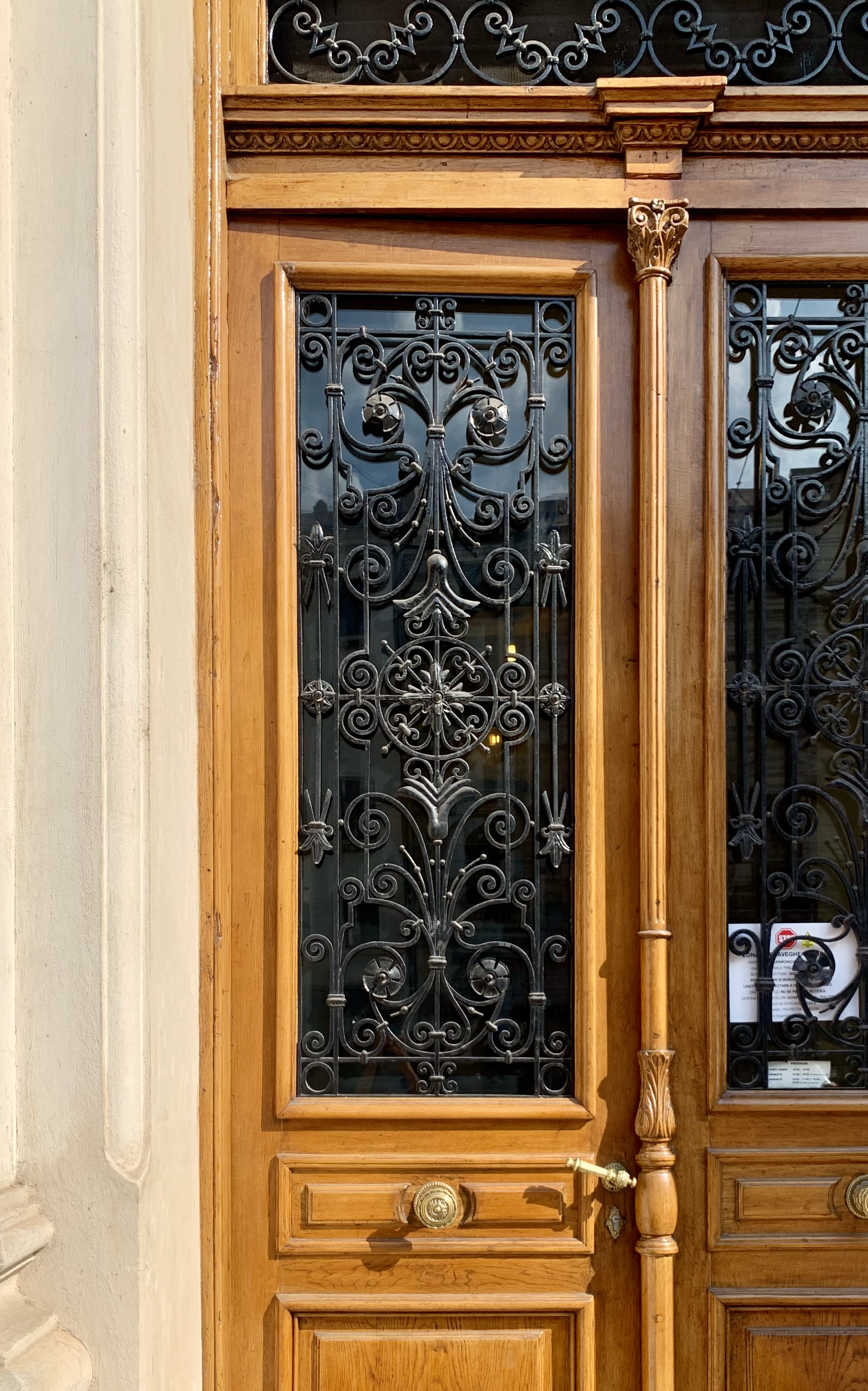
Simplified Neoclassical rosettes of a door of the Romanian Atheneum, Bucharest, Romania, by Albert Galleron, 1888

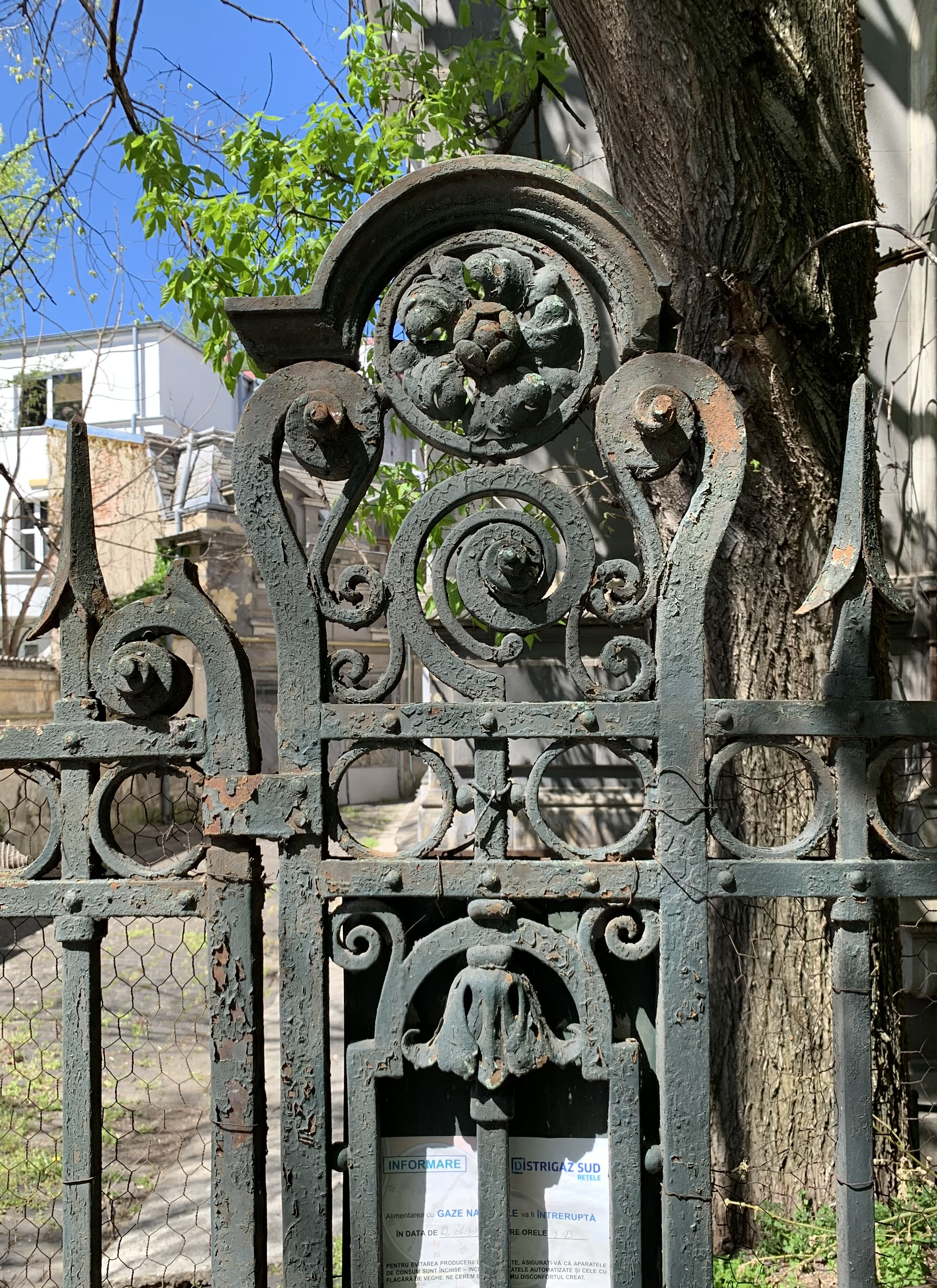
Rosettes on the Beaux-Arts fence of Strada Ionel Perlea no. 21, Bucharest, unknown architect, c.1900

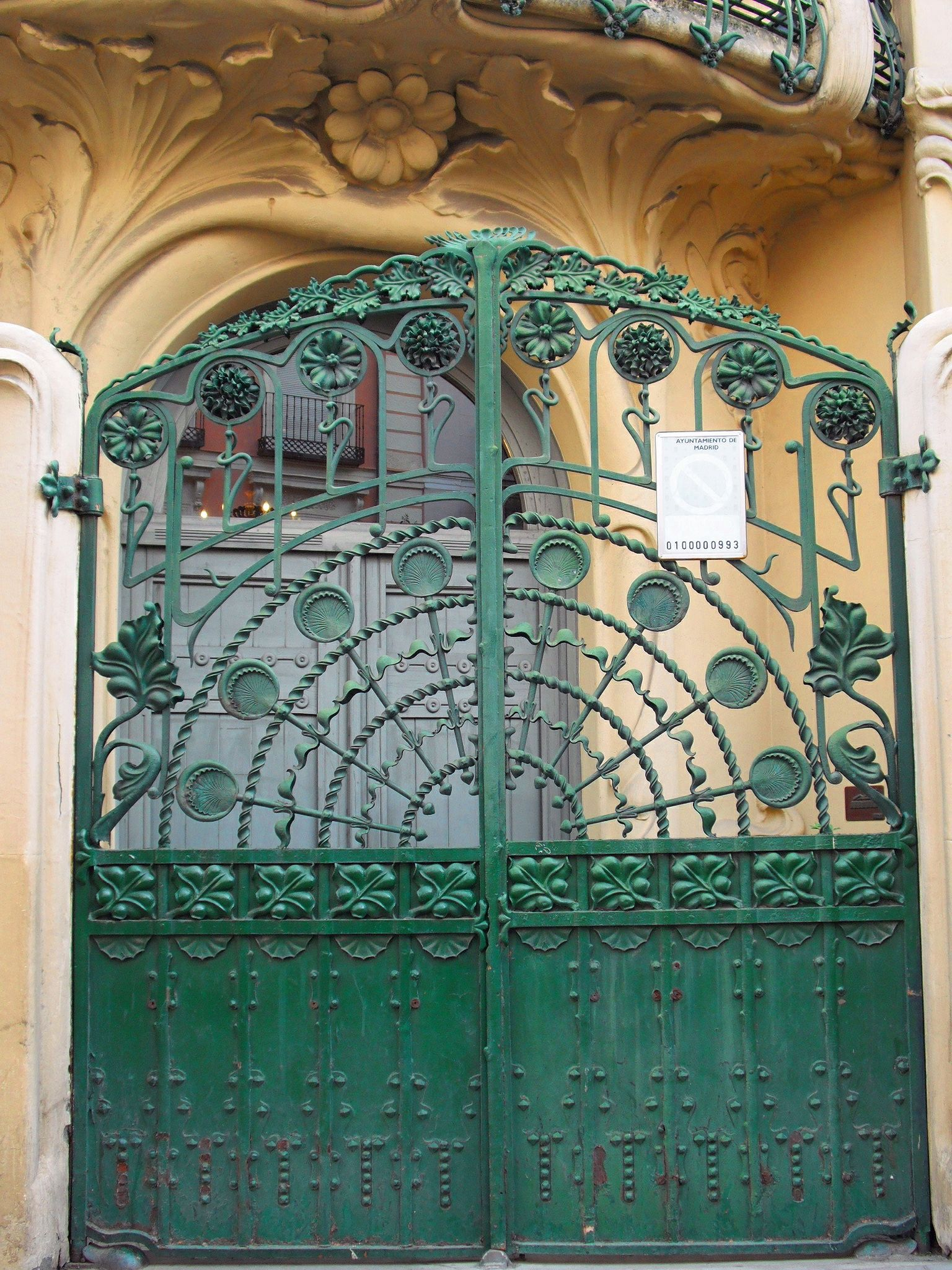
Art Nouveau rosettes on a gate of the Longoria Palace, Madrid, Spain, by José Grases Riera, 1902–1904

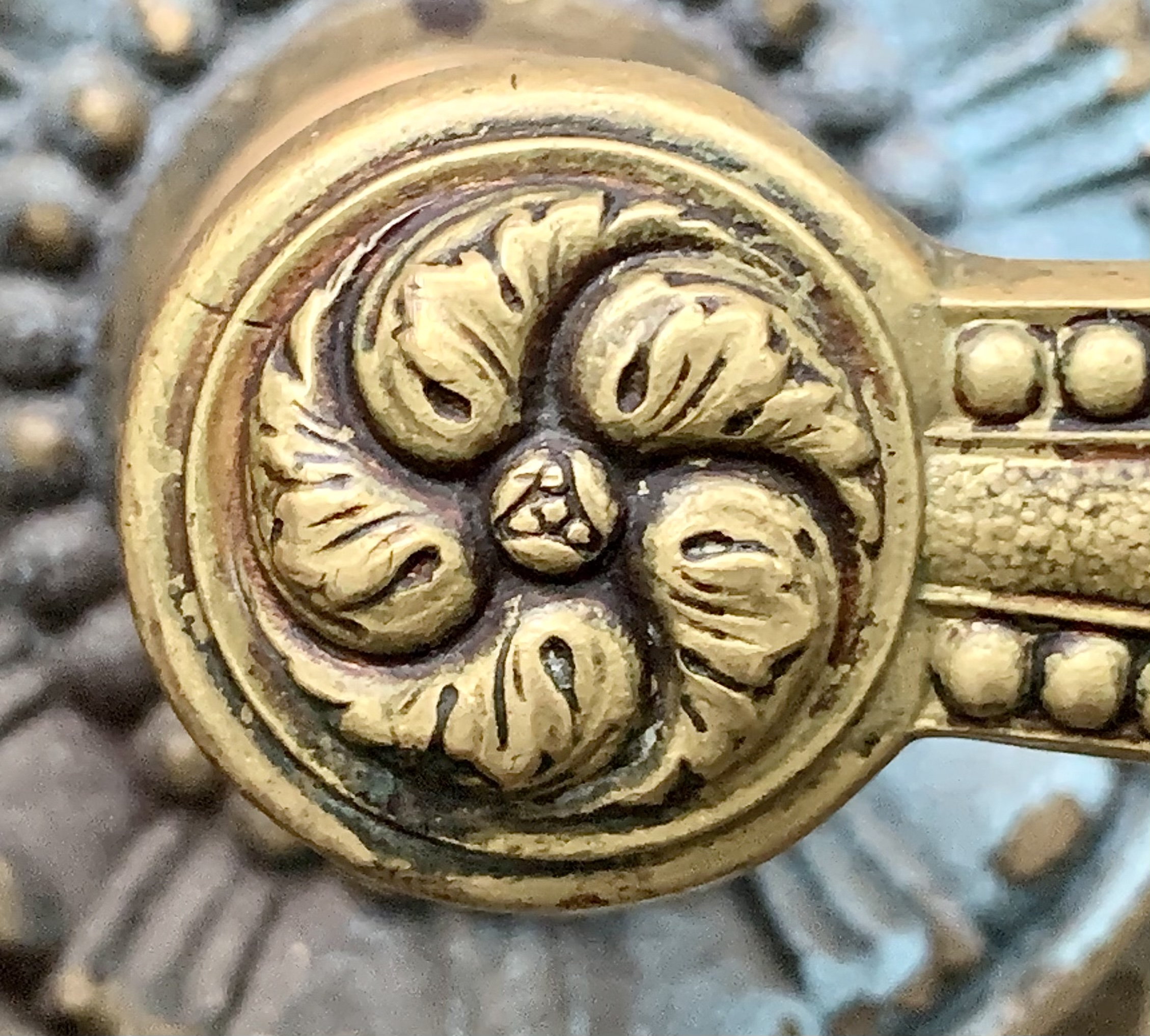
Neoclassical rosette on a handle of the lateral wing that faces Strada Edgar Quinet and Strada Academiei of the University Building, Bucharest, Romania, probably designed by Nicolae Ghica-Budești, 1914-1934

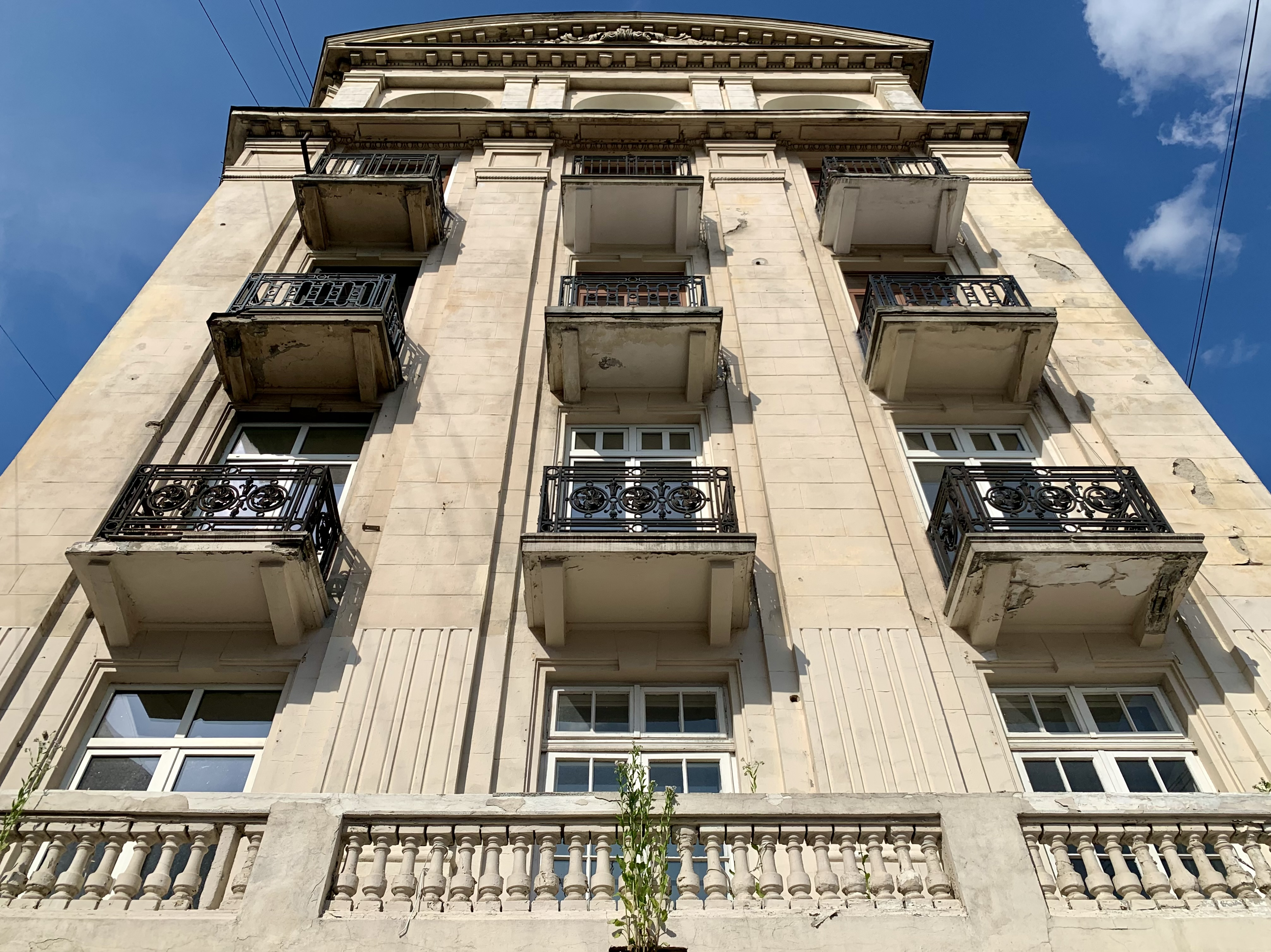
Rosettes on Beaux-Arts balconies of Strada Episcopiei no. 2–4, Bucharest, unknown architect, c.1920

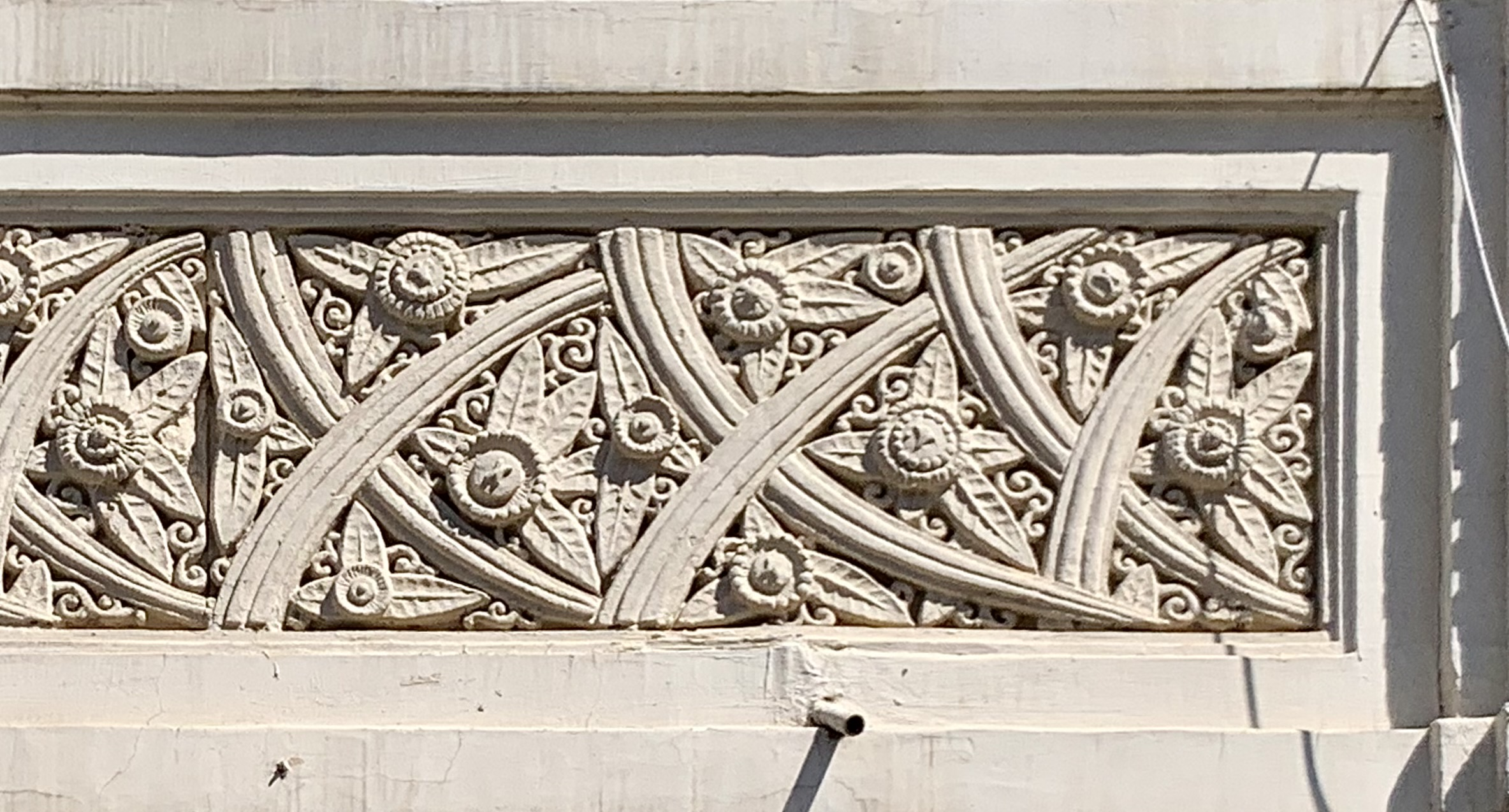
Art Deco rosettes on Strada Grigore Cobălcescu no. 56, Bucharest, unknown architect, c.1930

== See also ==
- Six petal rosette
