= Archaeological Museum of Nafplion =

Museum in Nafplio, Argolis, Greece

Archaeological Museum of Nafplio
- Αρχαιολογικό Μουσείο Ναυπλίου
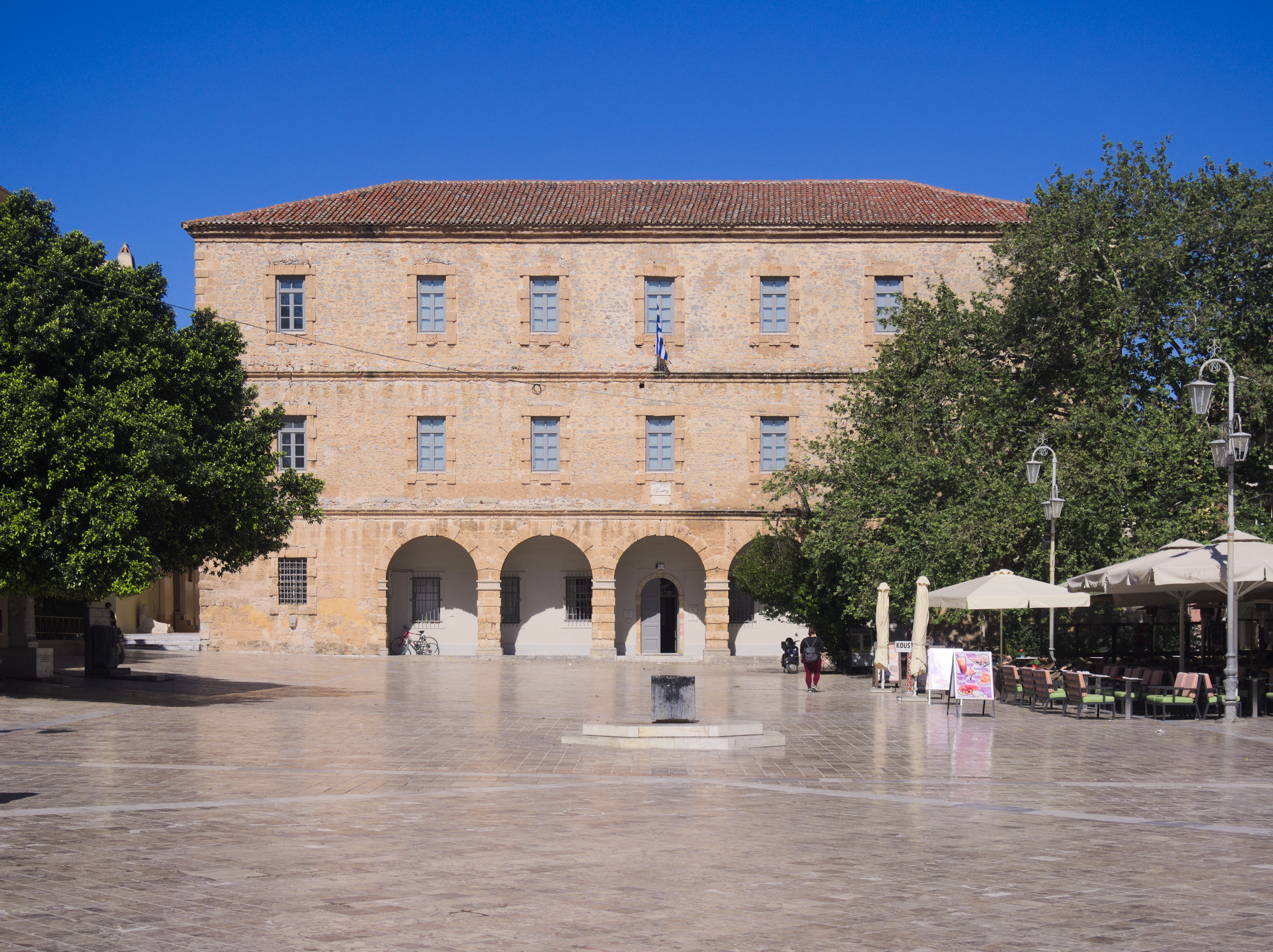
- The museum is located on two floors of the Venetian Naval Depository built in 1713
- Location: Syntagmatos Square, P.C:21100, Nafplio, Greece
- Coordinates: 37.5660663338289°N 22.796287536591876°E
- Type: Archaeology
- Collections: Paleolithic, Mesolithic, Neolithic, Mycenaean, Greeks, Romans
- Website: Official website

The Archaeological Museum of Nafplio is a museum in the town of Nafplio of the Argolis region in Greece. It has exhibits of the Neolithic, Chalcolithic, Helladic, Mycenaean, Classical, Hellenistic and Roman periods from all over southern Argolis. The museum is situated in the central square of Nafplion. It is housed in two floors of the old Venetian barracks.

== Discoveries from Franchthi Cave ==
The oldest exhibits in the museums are Paleolithic clay hearths from the Kleisoura Gorge near Prosymna (32,000-21,000 BCE), as well as stone and bone tools, shells, animal and fish bones and jewelry made from these materials that document the transition from hunting-gathering to farming recovered from Franchthi Cave. This archaeological site, excavated between 1967 and 1976, provides an unbroken series of deposits spanning the period from ca. 20,000 B.C.E. (and probably even earlier) down to ca. 3000 B.C.E., representing the longest recorded continuous occupational sequence from any one site in Greece as determined by radiocarbon (C-14) analysis.

=== Paleolithic period ===
Scholars speculate that inhabitants of the cave were probably seasonal hunter-gatherers as archaeologists found no evidence of habitation during the winter months based upon analysis of the botanical assemblage. The typical tools found were crafted of flint and chert as well as a small amount of obsidian including a backed bladelet, a tiny multi-purpose cutting tool, and small end-scrapers (for removing the flesh from hides) but no pottery or architecture.

=== Mesolithic period ===
Archaeological evidence points to a 300-600 year hiatus between Paleolithic and Mesolithic periods. Scholars point to changes in animal remains and botanical assemblages that may suggest a change of environment to more open forest. Obsidian microliths were recovered suggesting obsidian was obtained from Melos about 150 km away and human burials, both inhumation and cremation were found along with Andesite millstones indicating Franchthi Cave was inhabited on a more permanent basis.

=== Neolithic period ===
The museum's collection of clay vases and both anthropomorphic and zoomorphic clay figurines testify to cultural evolution that occurred during the Neolithic period. Archaeologists discovered remains of domesticated sheep and goats, the appearance of domesticated forms of wheat, barley, and lentils as well as polished stone tools and a significant increase in grinding stones and sickle elements used to cut plants. Ceramic vessels from the Early Neolithic are dark monochrome burnished ware fired at relatively low temperatures. A small percentage are painted in red or red-brown patterns. Surprisingly, scholars have speculated that these vessels were probably only art objects used for display based on their shape, size, and decoration, as well as signs of wear and repair. A small footed clay vase found in an infant's grave is thought to indicate the development of hereditary status at this time.

Middle Neolithic pottery in the museum's collections, termed "Urfirnis", is more uniform and lighter than earlier examples. Scholars think potters had clearly learned to purify their clay more thoroughly and to fire their products at higher temperatures (ca. 800C), in significantly larger batches. These ceramics also reflect the application of a reddish slip or wash and the variety of forms and indications of heat discoloration point to their use as cooking vessels. Grave goods, including bone tools, obsidian blades, and pottery point to the accumulation of personal possessions as well as the development of hierarchal social status.

The museum's display of fine black-burnished ware is from the Late Neolithic period. It is decorated with a "ghost" of white paint giving the impression of a negative on the black surface. Pottery with a dark-on-light pattern painted with dull manganese-based paint is also presented from this period.

== Franchthi Cave gallery ==
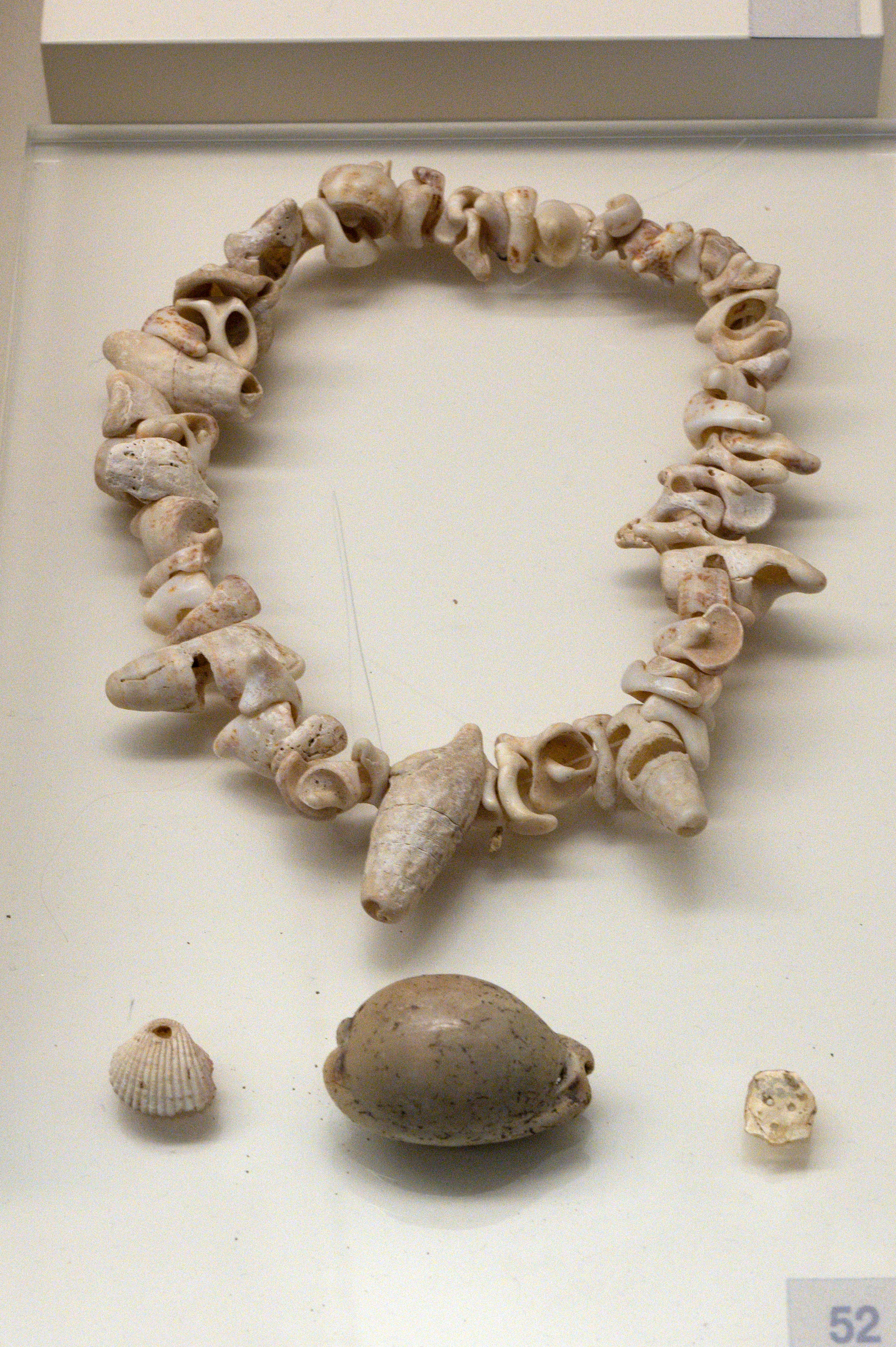
Neolithic shells and jewelry, 6800-3200 BCE

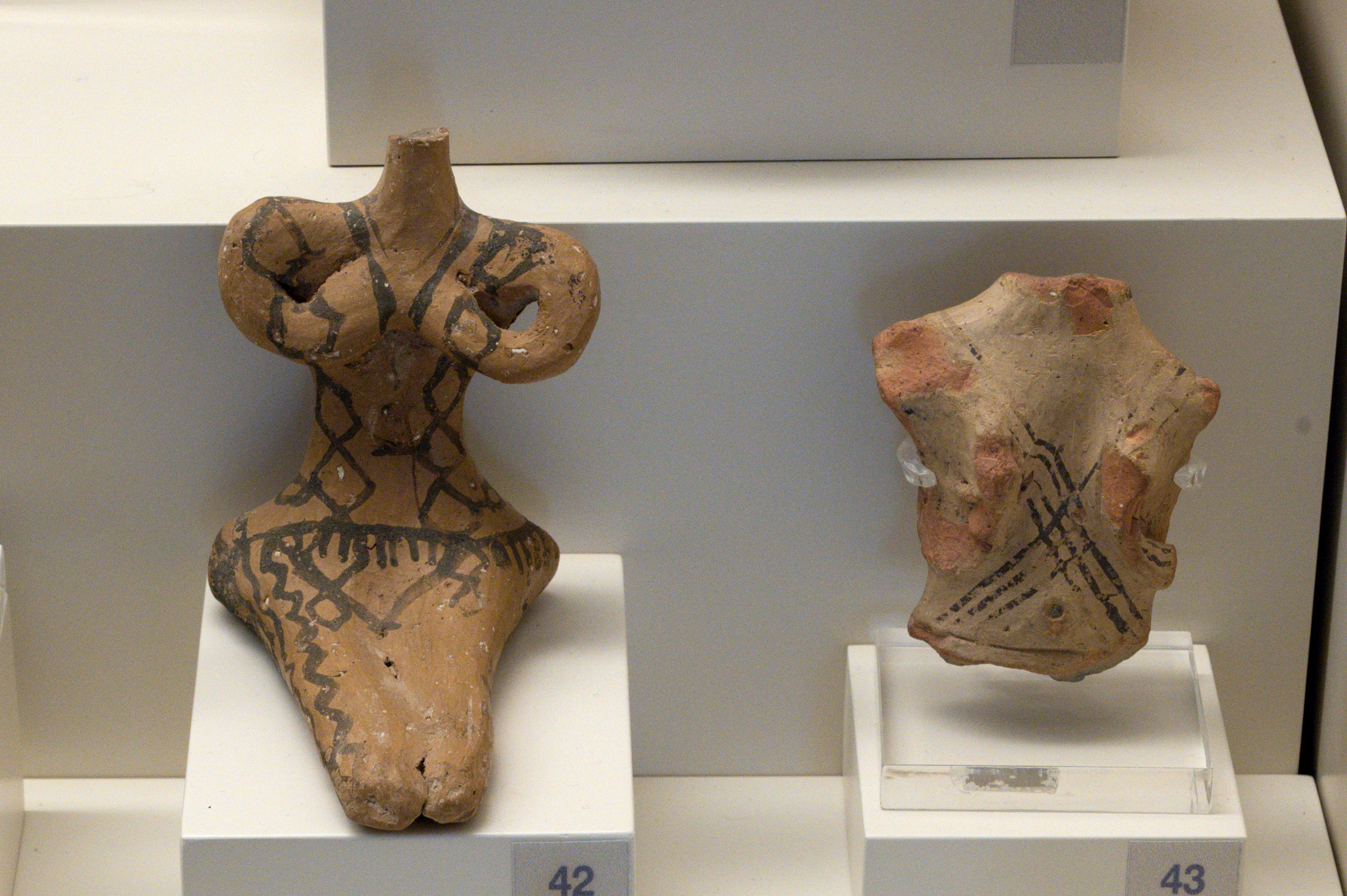
Neolithic female figurines, 5300-4500 BCE

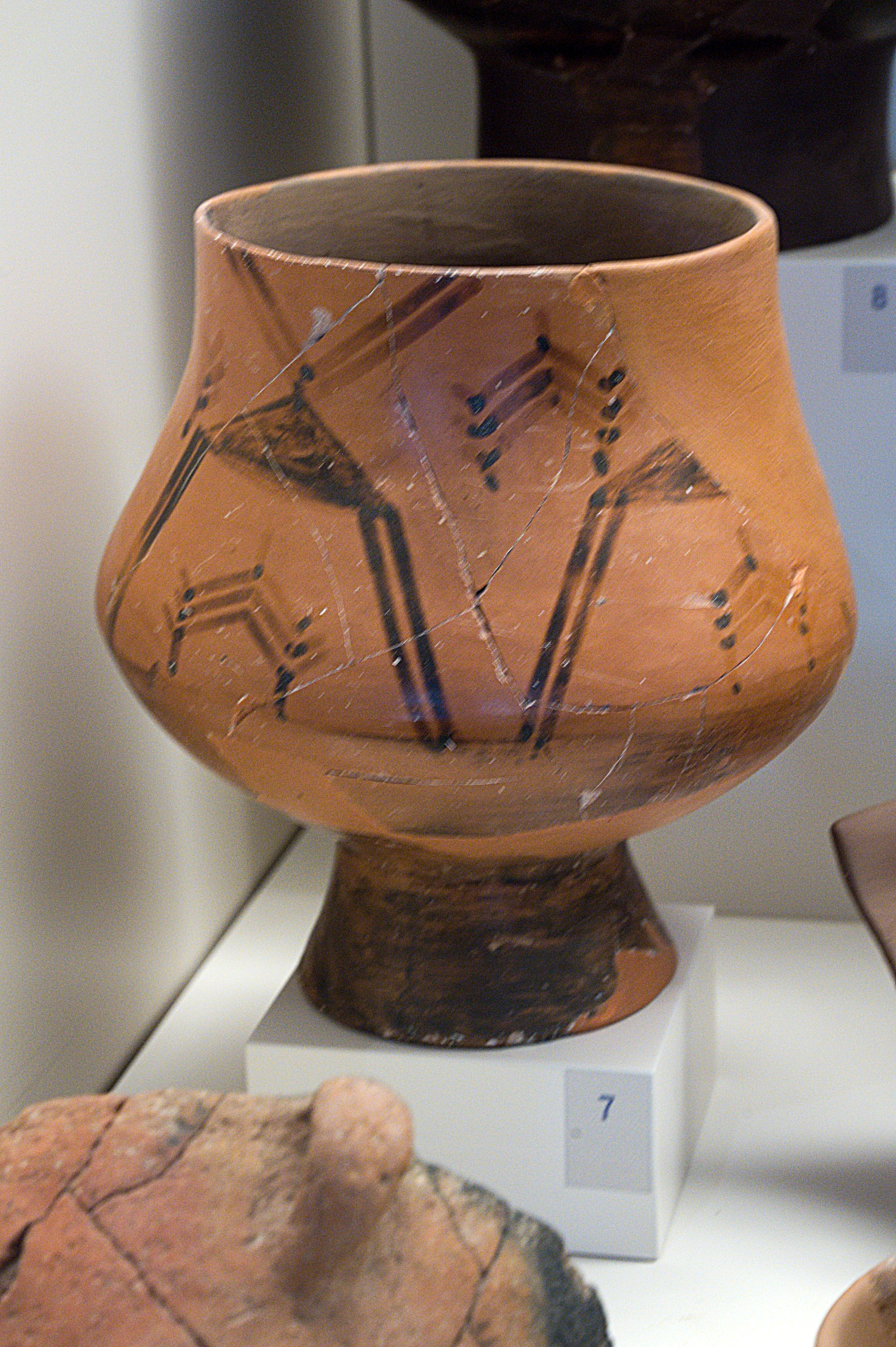
Neolithic pottery, 5800-5300 BCE

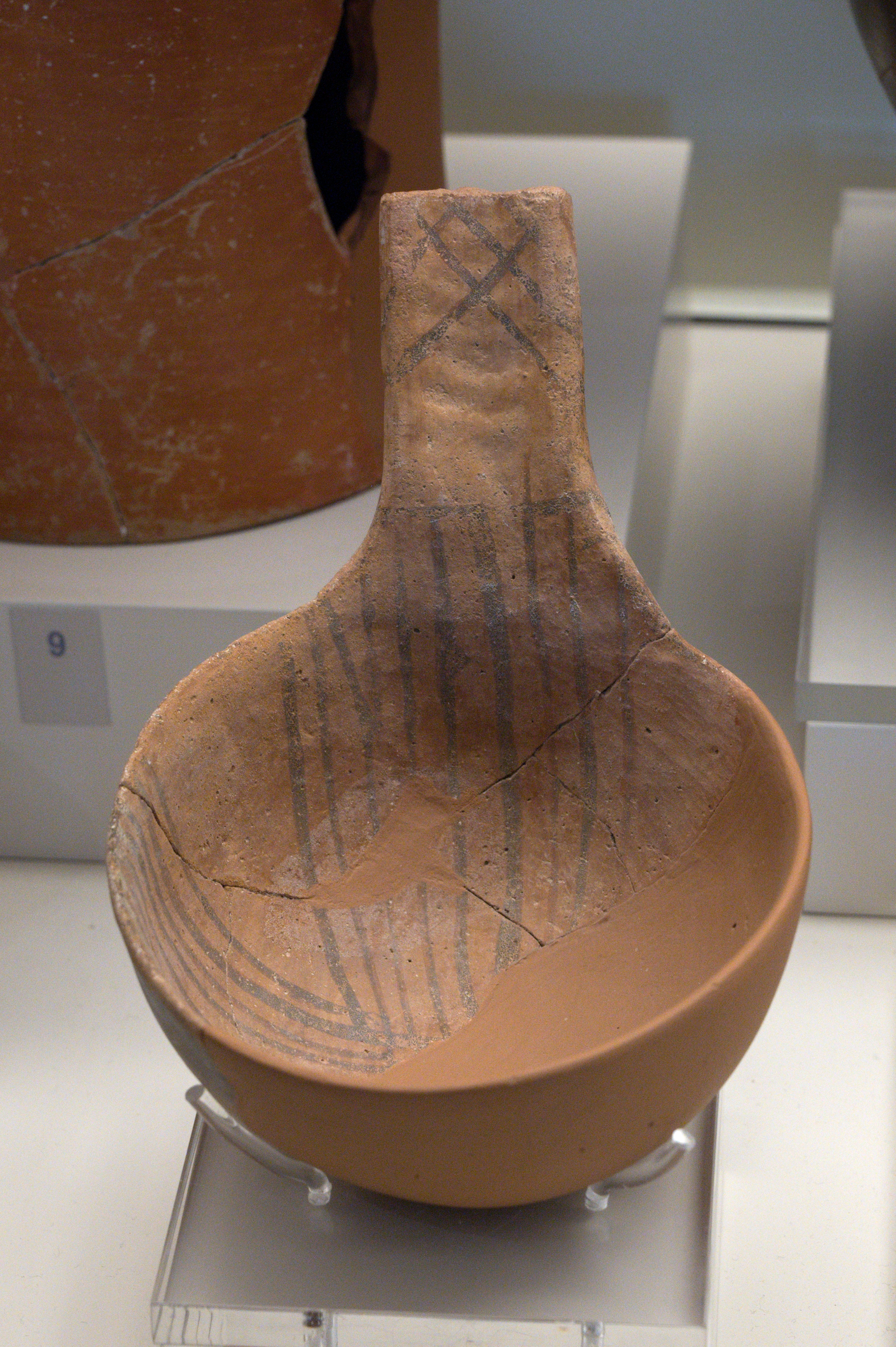
Neolithic pottery ladle, 5800-5300 BCE

== Helladic period finds ==
The early Helladic period (3300-2100/2000 BCE) is represented by exhibits from Tiryns, Asine, Berbati and Palaia Epidauros. Artifacts from the early Helladic period include pottery, stone, clay and bronze seals, clay sealings, bone tools, early Cycladic marble figurines, a clay hearth from Berbati and a well preserved wine cooler from Tiryns dating from 2700-2200 BCE.

Vases and other artifacts from the Middle Helladic settlements at Tiryns, Asine, Berbati as well as the Palamidi-Pronoia cemetery at Nafplion, and Midea cover the entire chronological range of the middle Helladic period (2100/2000-1600 BCE), the culture which formed the substrate for Mycenaean culture.

=== Tiryns ===
Tiryns was a hill fort in the Argolid peninsula with occupation ranging back seven thousand years. It was originally excavated by Heinrich Schliemann in 1884–1885, and is the subject of ongoing excavations by the German Archaeological Institute at Athens and the University of Heidelberg. A flourishing early pre-Hellenic settlement located about 15 km southeast of Mycenae was built on the site during the middle of the 3rd millennium BCE and included a circular fortification constructed from two concentric stone walls. The first Greek inhabitants—the creators of the Middle Helladic civilization and the Mycenaean civilization after that—settled Tiryns at the beginning of the Middle Helladic period (2000–1600 BCE). The Acropolis was constructed in three phases, the first at the end of the Late Helladic II period (1500–1400 BCE), the second in Late Helladic III (1400–1300 BCE), and the third at the end of the Late Helladic III B (1300–1200 BCE). The city underwent its greatest growth during the Mycenaean period but it suffered from the disaster that struck the Mycenaean centers at the end of the Bronze Age. It was not abandoned, however, as archaeological evidence indicates it was inhabited continuously until the middle of the 8th century BCE.

=== Asine ===
Asine was also a city of ancient Argolis and was mentioned by Homer in the Iliad as under the rule of Diomedes, king of Argos. It is said to have been founded by the Dryopes, an aboriginal tribes of ancient Greece when Heracles and the Malians drove them out of the valleys of Mount Oeta and gave their homeland to the Dorians.

=== Berbati ===
Berbati, the ancient name for Prosymna, was another ancient site where archaeologists found remains dating back to Neolithic times. It became a site for ceramic production and its vessels were exported throughout the northeast Peloponnese. In 1878, in the area of ancient Prosymna, Panagiotis Stamatakis found a tomb in the form of a tholos that was built in the Mycenaean epoch and that was also reused in later periods. Archaeological investigations continued under the auspices of the Swedish Institute at Athens in the 1930s and then during the 1980s and 1990s that found two settlement areas on two different sides of the Mastos hill slope, belonging to the Early and Late Helladic periods, respectively.

== Helladic gallery ==
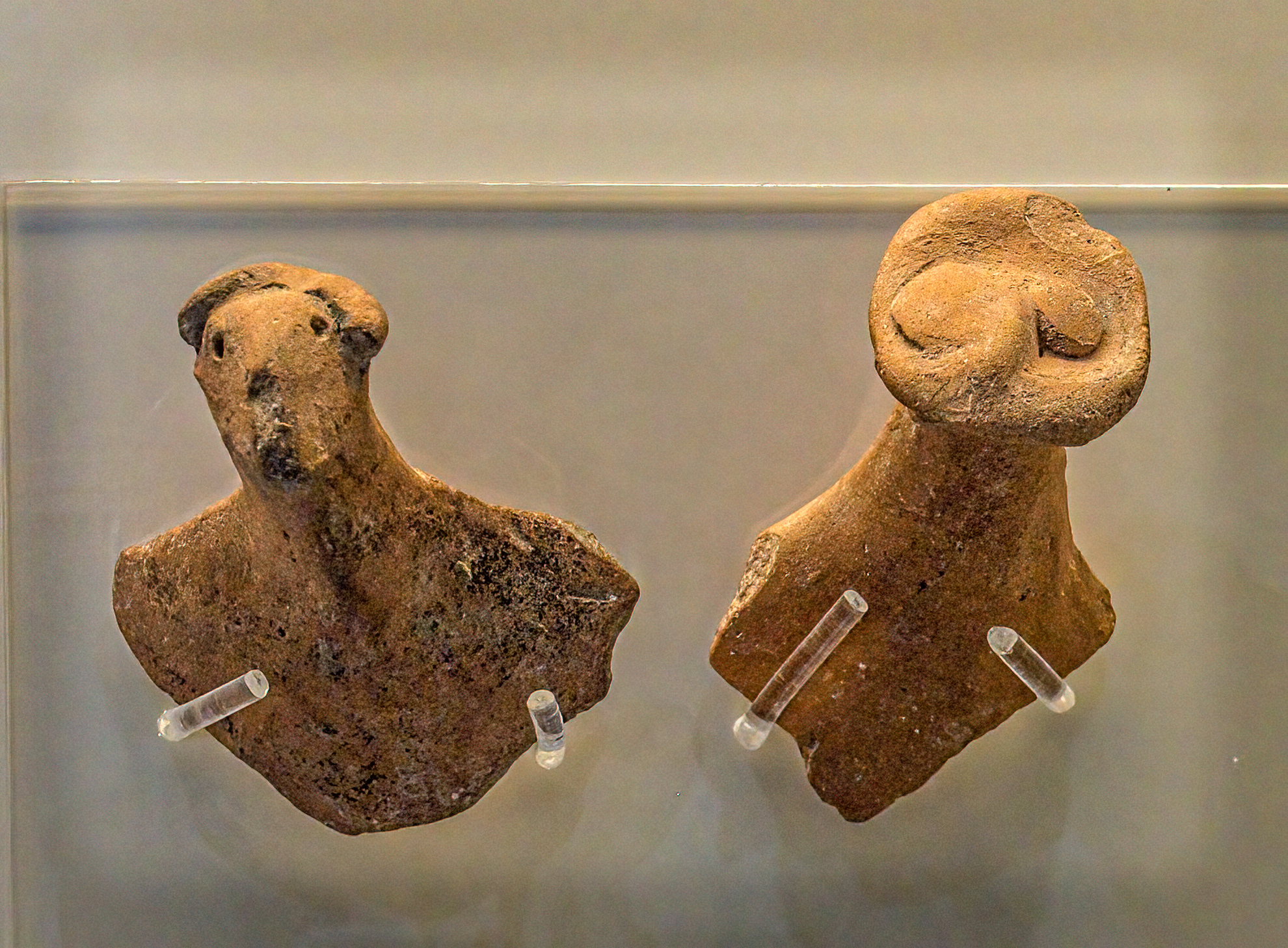
Figurine fragments, Early Helladic, Tiryns, 2700-2000 BCE

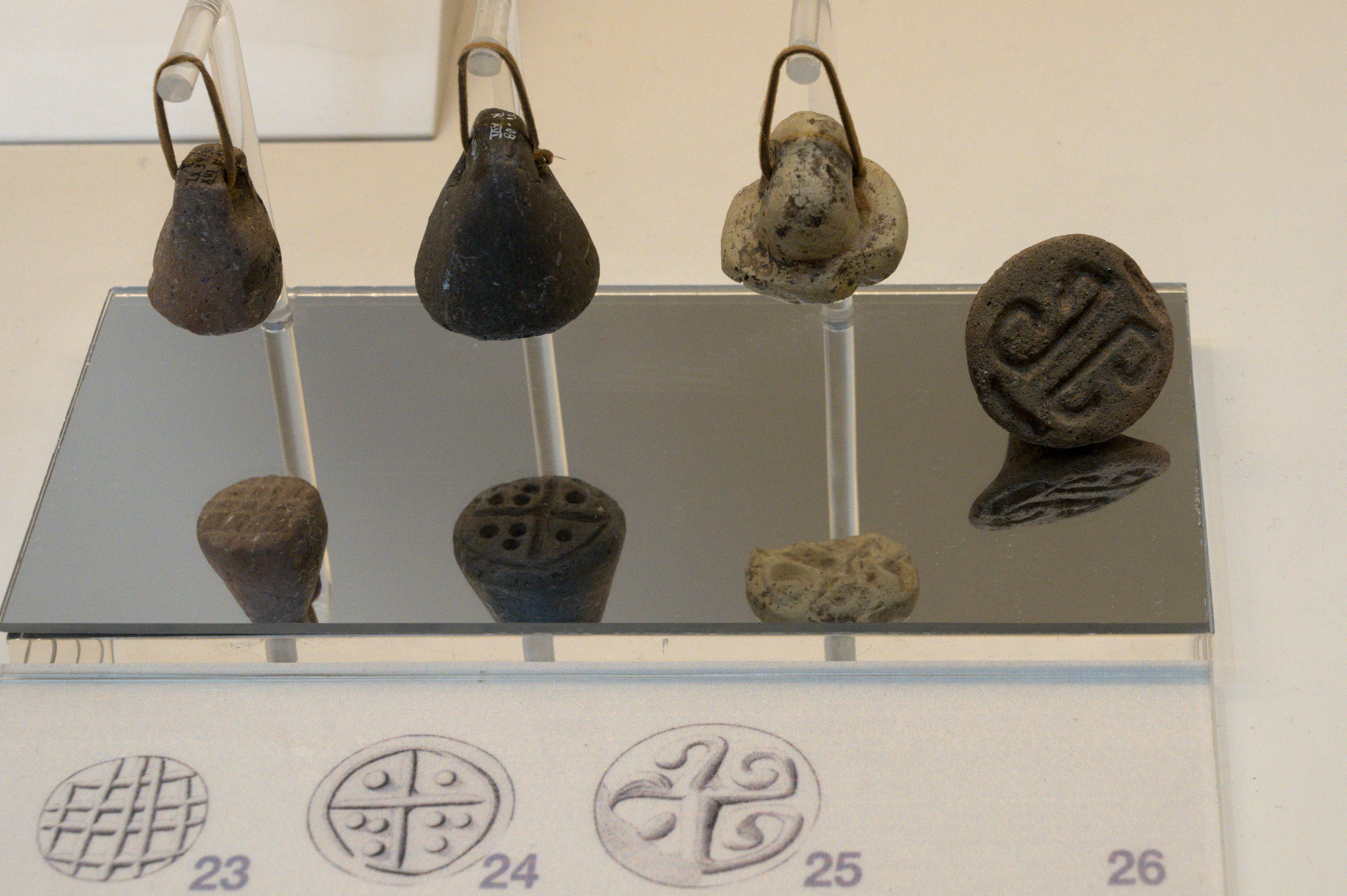
Seals, probably 2700-2200 BCE

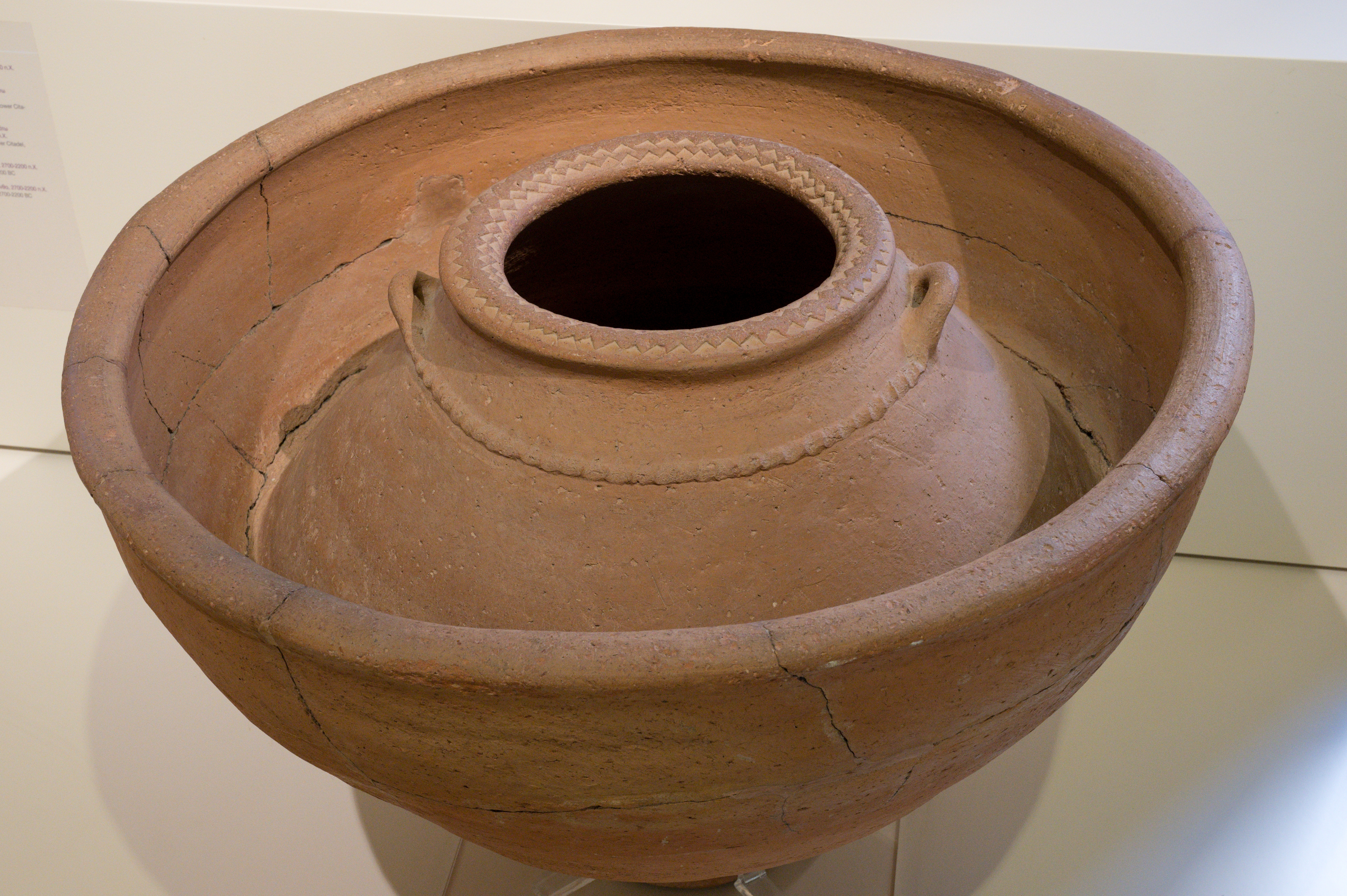
Wine cooler, Tiryns, 2700-2200 BCE

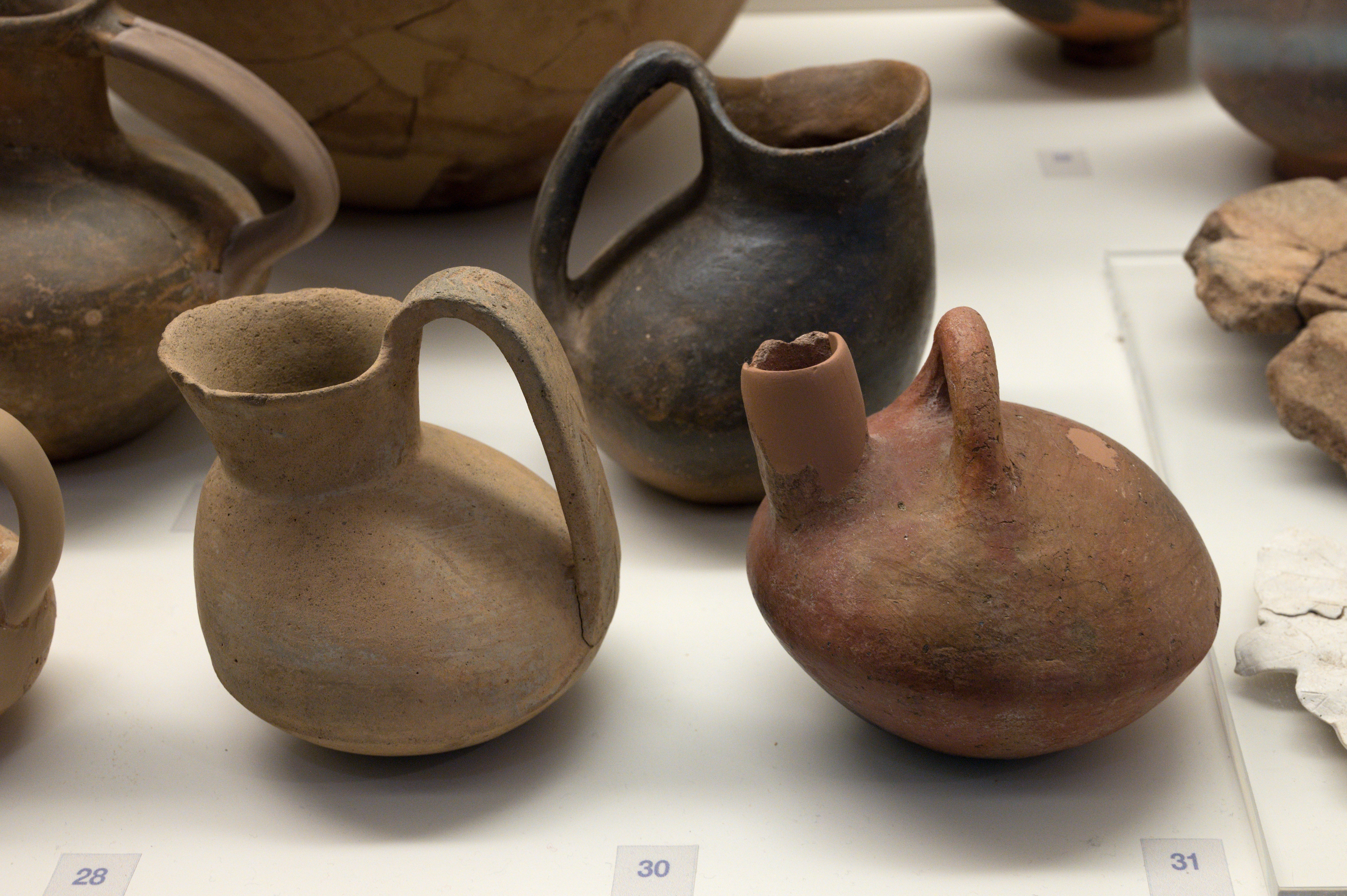
Askoi, 2700-2200 BCE

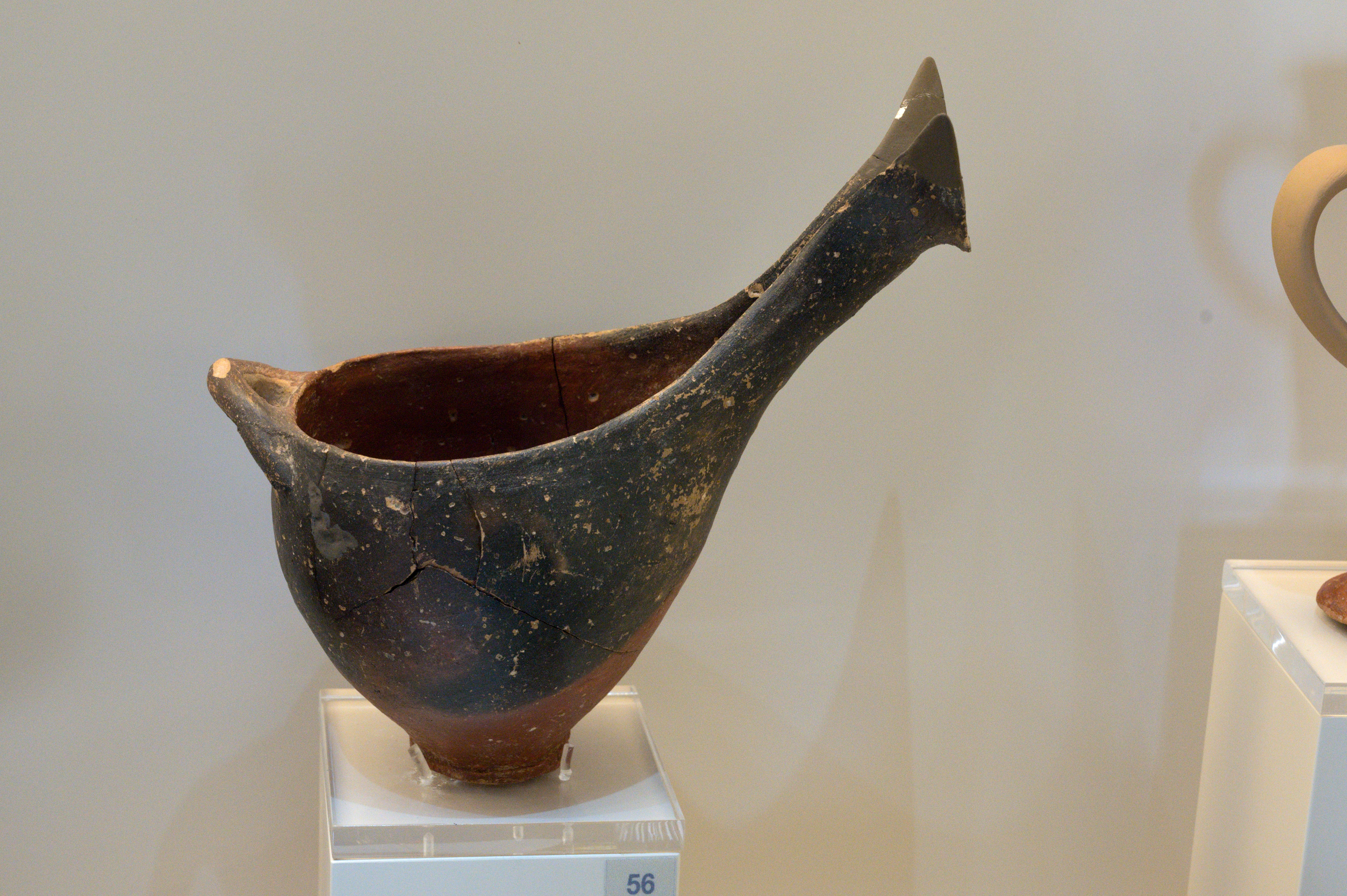
Sauceboat. Tiryns, Lower citadel, 2700-2200 BCE

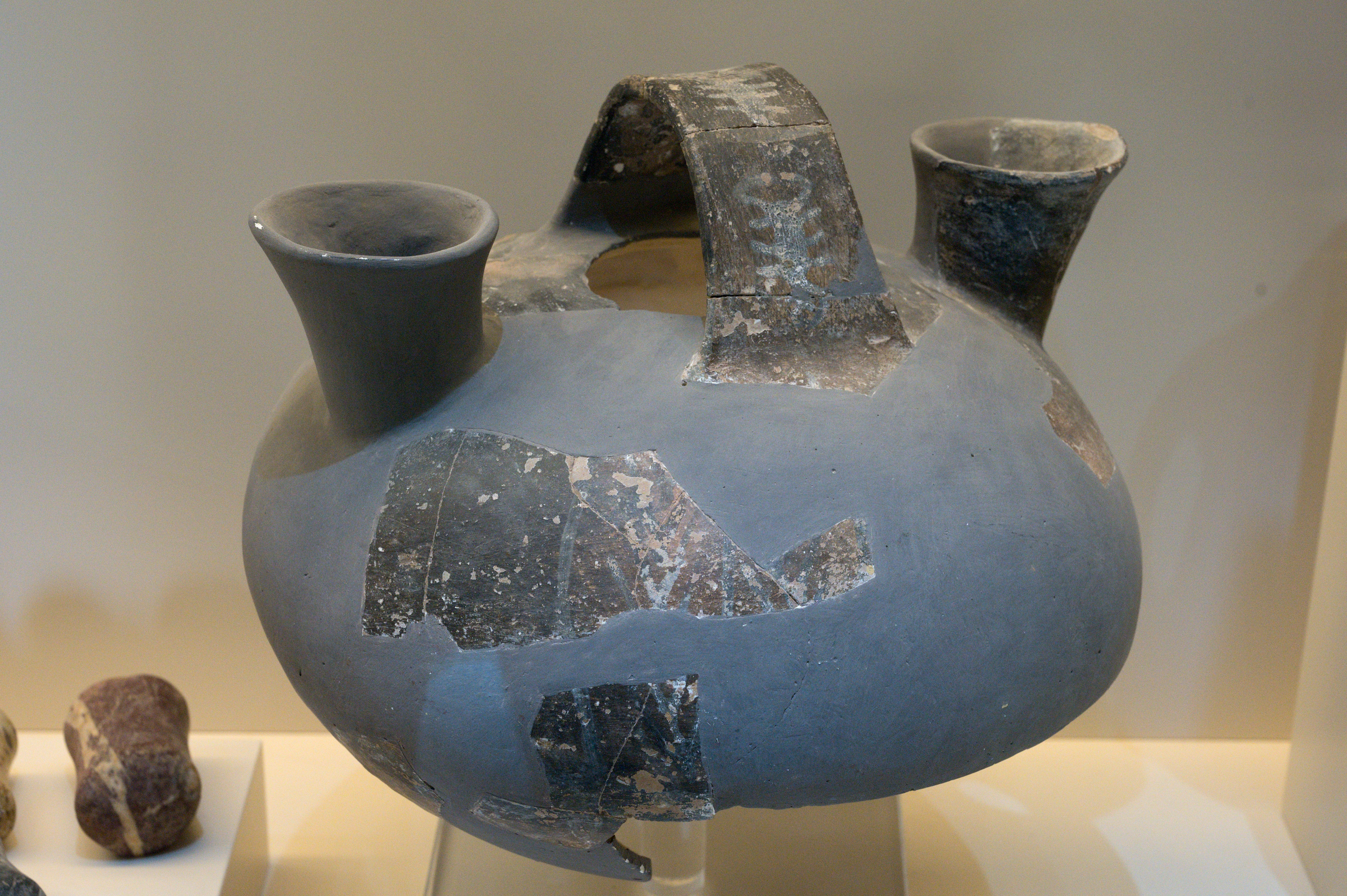
Askos with scorpions, Tiryns, Lower citadel, 2200-2000 BCE

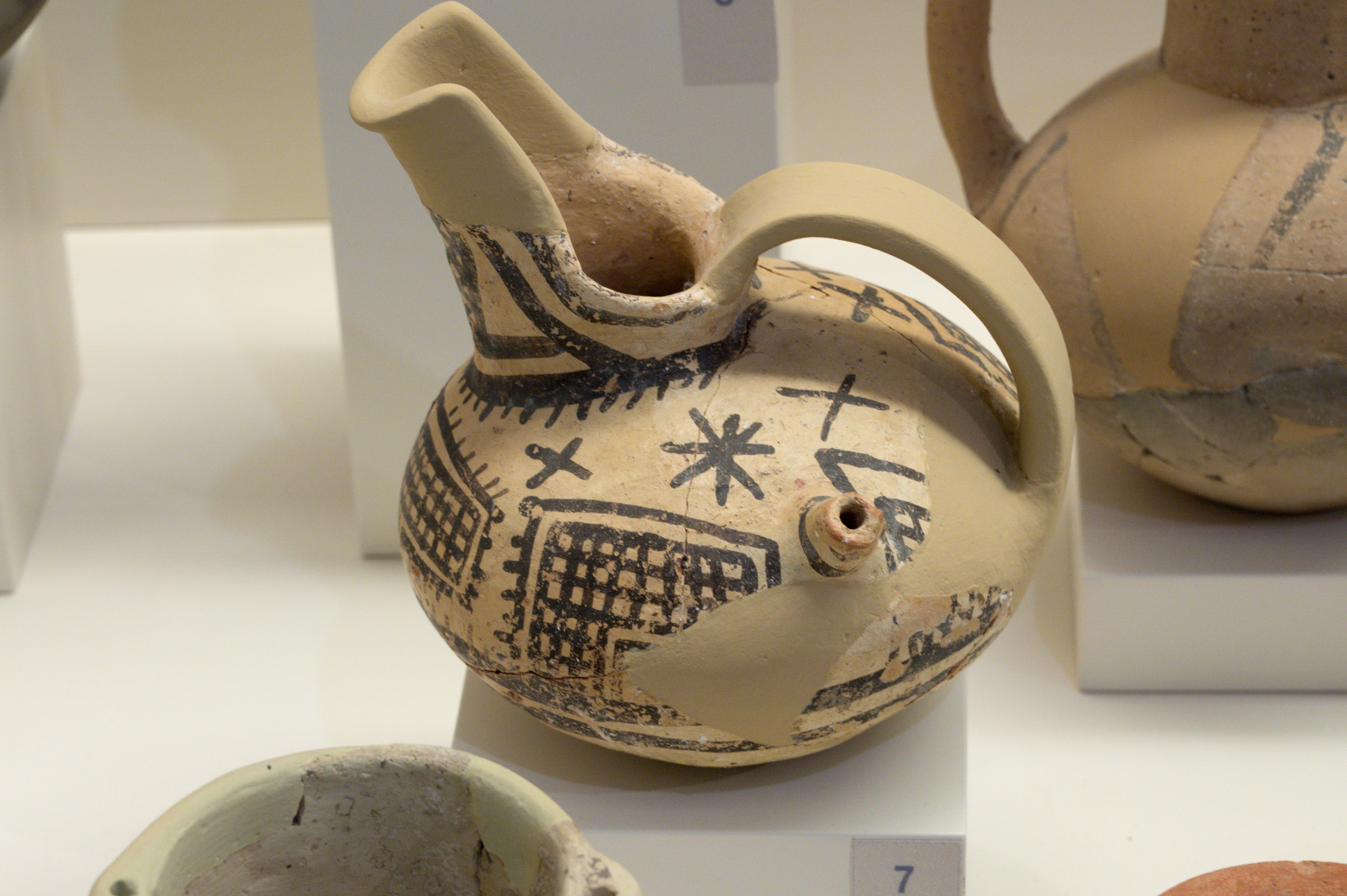
Askos, Berbati, 2200-2000 BCE

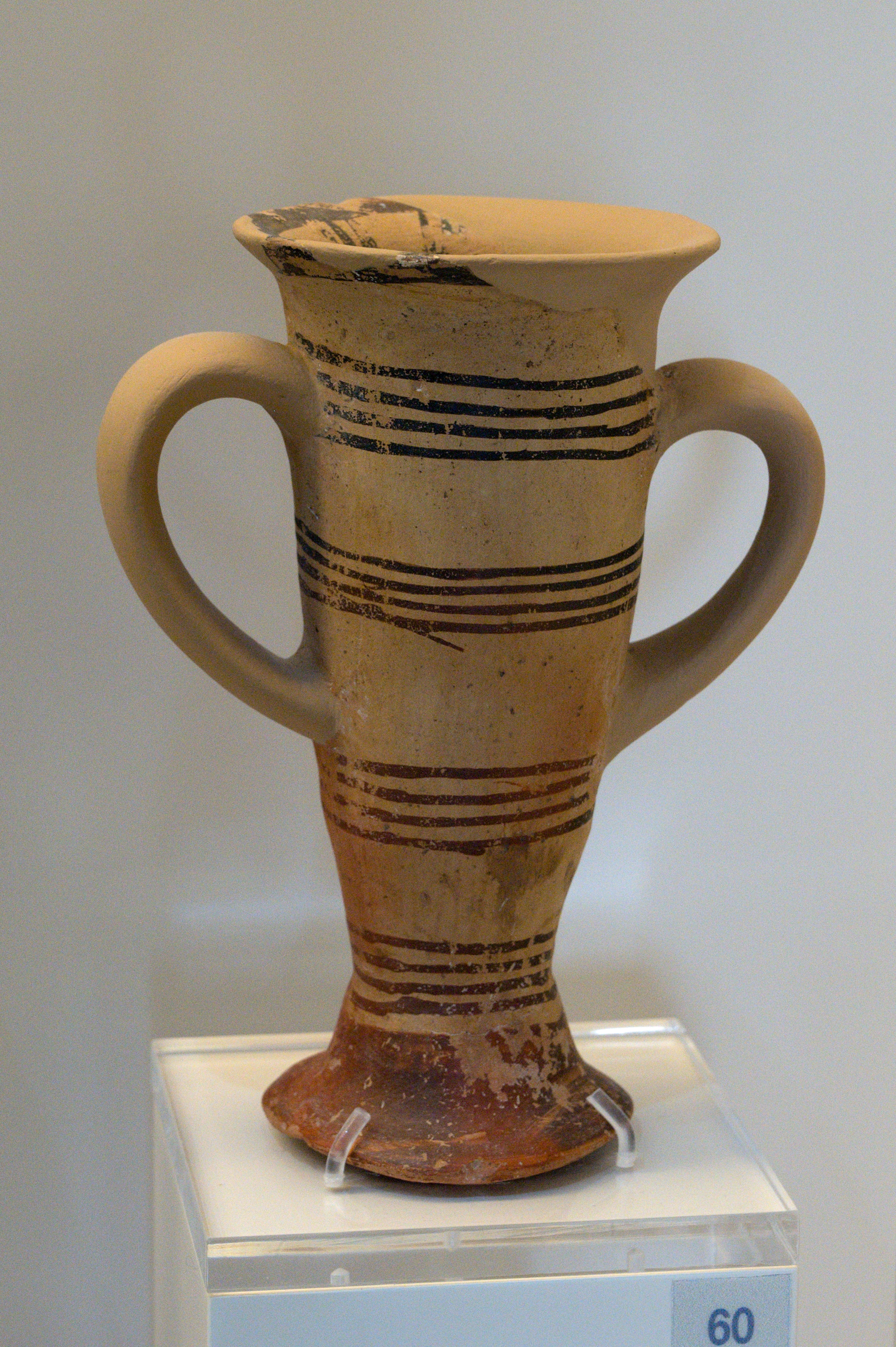
Twin-handled footed cup, Tiryns, 2200-2000 BCE

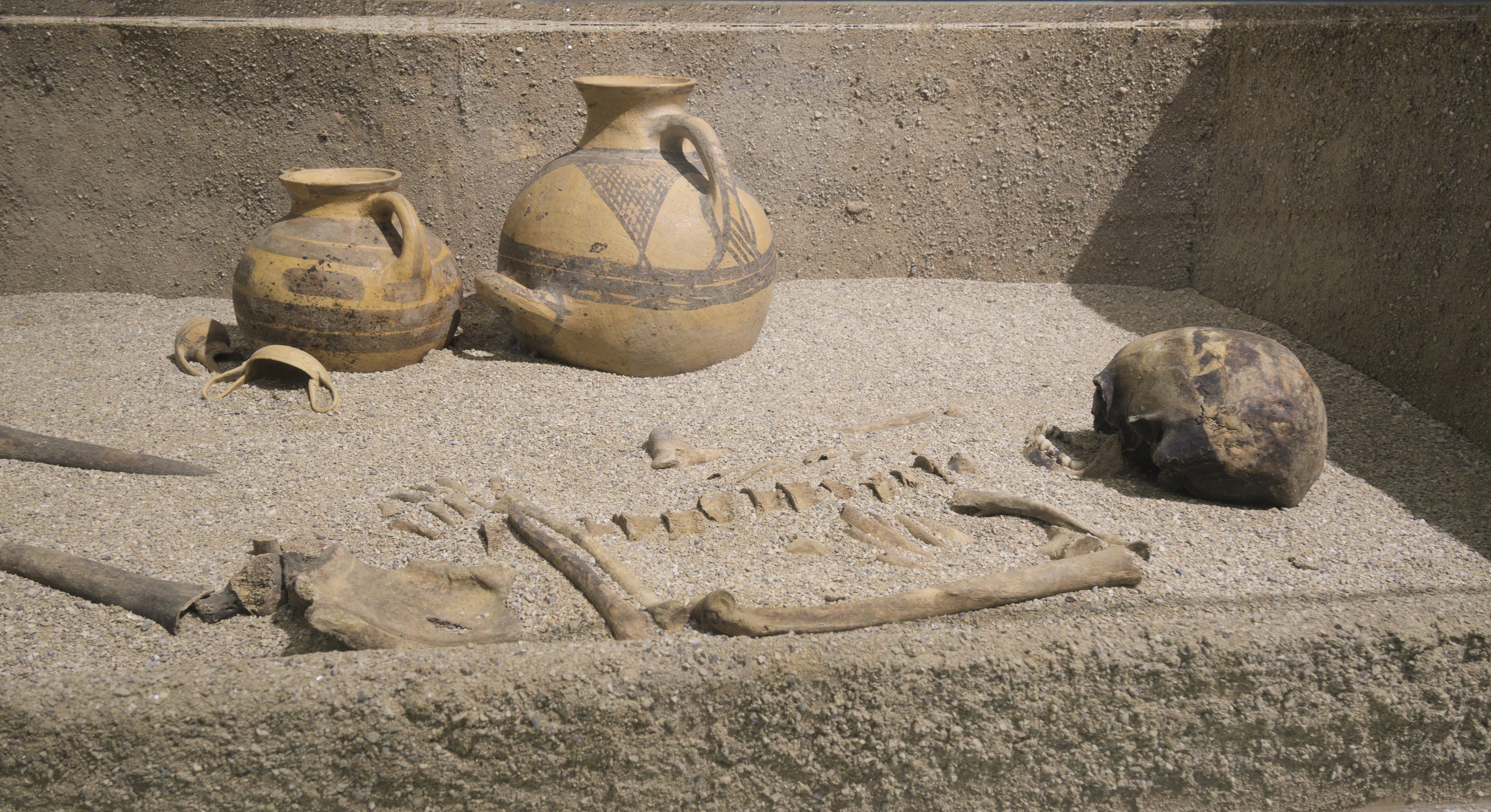
Middle Helladic Burial site No. 26 at Berbati, reconstructed

=== Palaia (Archaia) Epidavros ===
Palaia (Archaia) Epidavros, now combined with Nea Epidavros since 2010, was mentioned in Homer's Iliad as "rich in wine" and for sending a large number of ships to Troy. Its necropolis has revealed that original occupation of the site dated to at least the middle of the 2nd millennium BCE. Systematic excavations of the site did not begin until the 1970s and were focused on the Mycenaean necropolis northwest of the city and the acropolis located on the small peninsula to the east. Several rock-cut tombs were explored and a classical temple dedicated to Artemis examined. A temple dedicated to Hera lies beneath the existing church of Agios Nikolaos. Its small theater that seated around 2,000 people has been dated to the 4th century BCE. Archaeological excavations are ongoing and include exploration of the Roman remains of a bath house and sewage system.

=== Nafplio ===
Nafplio was known as Nauplia in Classical Antiquity and was the port of Argos, in ancient Argolis. It was said to derive its name from Nauplus, the son of Poseidon and Amymone. Pausanias reports that the city was originally a colony of Egyptians brought to Argos by Danaus the son of King Belus of Egypt, said to be the son of Poseidon.

=== Midea ===
Midea, originally known as Perseuspolis, was celebrated as the residence of Electryon, the son of Perseus and Andromeda. It was ruled by King Proteus of Argos. Its remains include a Bronze Age citadel, a tholos tomb, and a necropolis of chamber tombs. It was excavated by Swedish archaeologist Axel W. Persson about 1926 and excavations continue under the auspices of the Swedish Institute at Athens. In 2006, remains of an early Helladic II defensive system were uncovered at the site of the Upper Acropolis. Pottery dating to the Helladic I period and late Helladic IIB2 period were also recovered including two human figurines. Excavations continued in 2007 and human skeletons were exposed in a level with evidence of destruction in the late Helladic IIIB2 period.

== Mycenaean period ==
Impressive wheel-made female figurines as well as the "Lady of Asine" sculpture, Linear B tablets, storage amphorae, workshop remains, Mittanian cylinder seals from northern Syria, a bronze ingot and objects made of faience, amber and alabaster in the museum's Mycenaean collections were recovered from Tiryns, Midea, and Asine.

Exhibits from cist graves and chamber tombs in the cemeteries of Evangelistria (Nafplion), Asine, and Palaia Epidauros, as well as Dendra and the tholos tomb at the village of Kazarma in the Messinia unit of the Peloponnese include stone metal and clay vases, figurines, ivory pieces, seal stones and jewelry of gold, semi-precious stones, amber, faience and glass.

=== Dendra Panoply ===
Among these objects that reflect the hierarchy of Mycenaean society, is a rare, almost complete set of Mycenaean armor made of bronze bands from the late 15th century BCE. The beaten bronze cuirass was found by Swedish archaeologists at Dendra. The panoply consists of fifteen separate pieces of bronze sheet, held together with leather thongs, that encased the wearer from neck to knees. Its high bronze collar was a typical feature of Near Eastern body armor. Slivers of boars’ tusks were also discovered, which once made up a boar's tusk helmet. Later excavations also revealed Bronze Age tumulus burials which included sacrificed horses.

== Mycenaean gallery ==
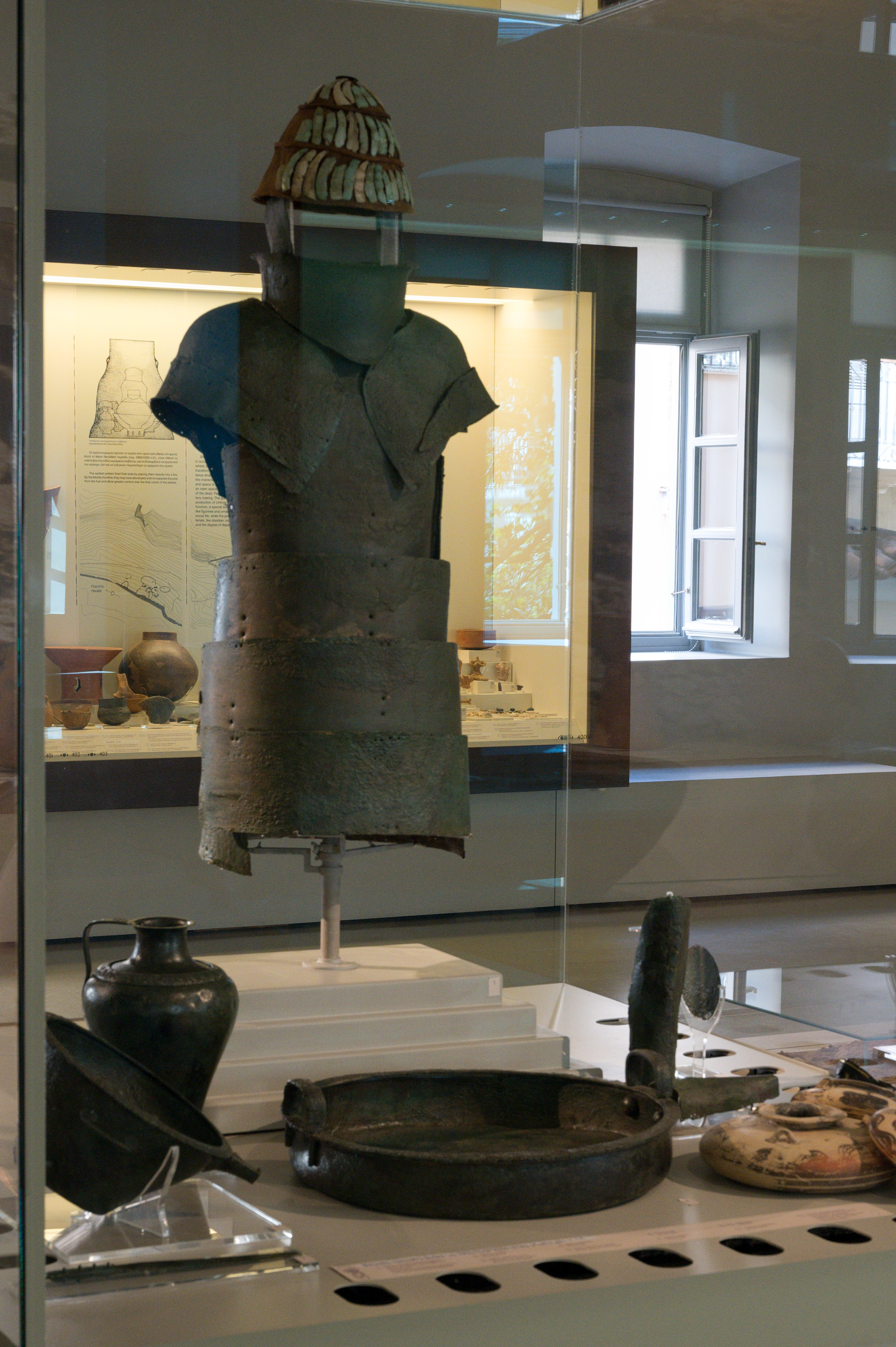
Dendra panoply with grave goods found in Chamber Tomb 12 at Dendra

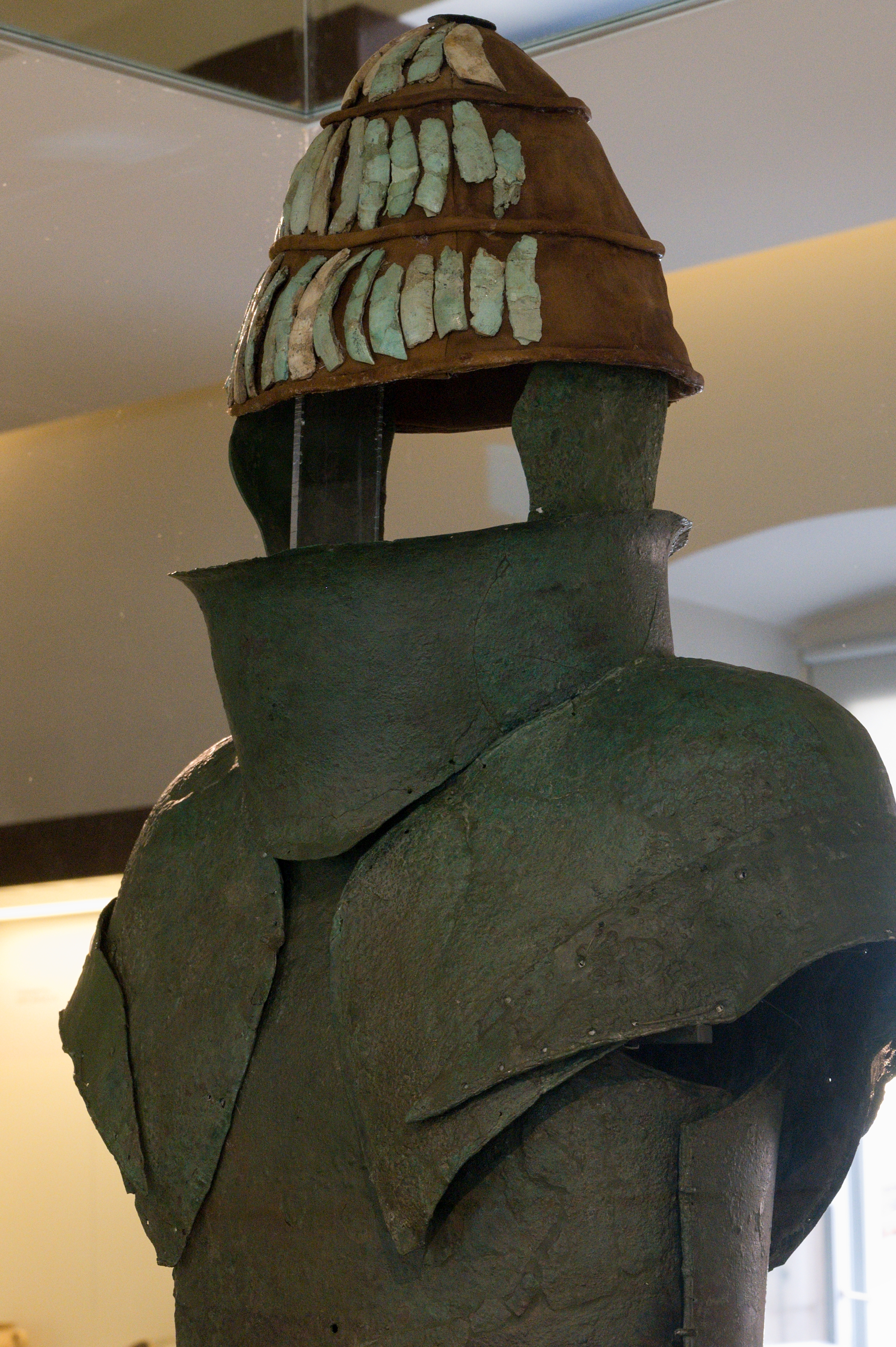
remains of boar's tusk helmet found in Chamber Tomb 12 at Dendra

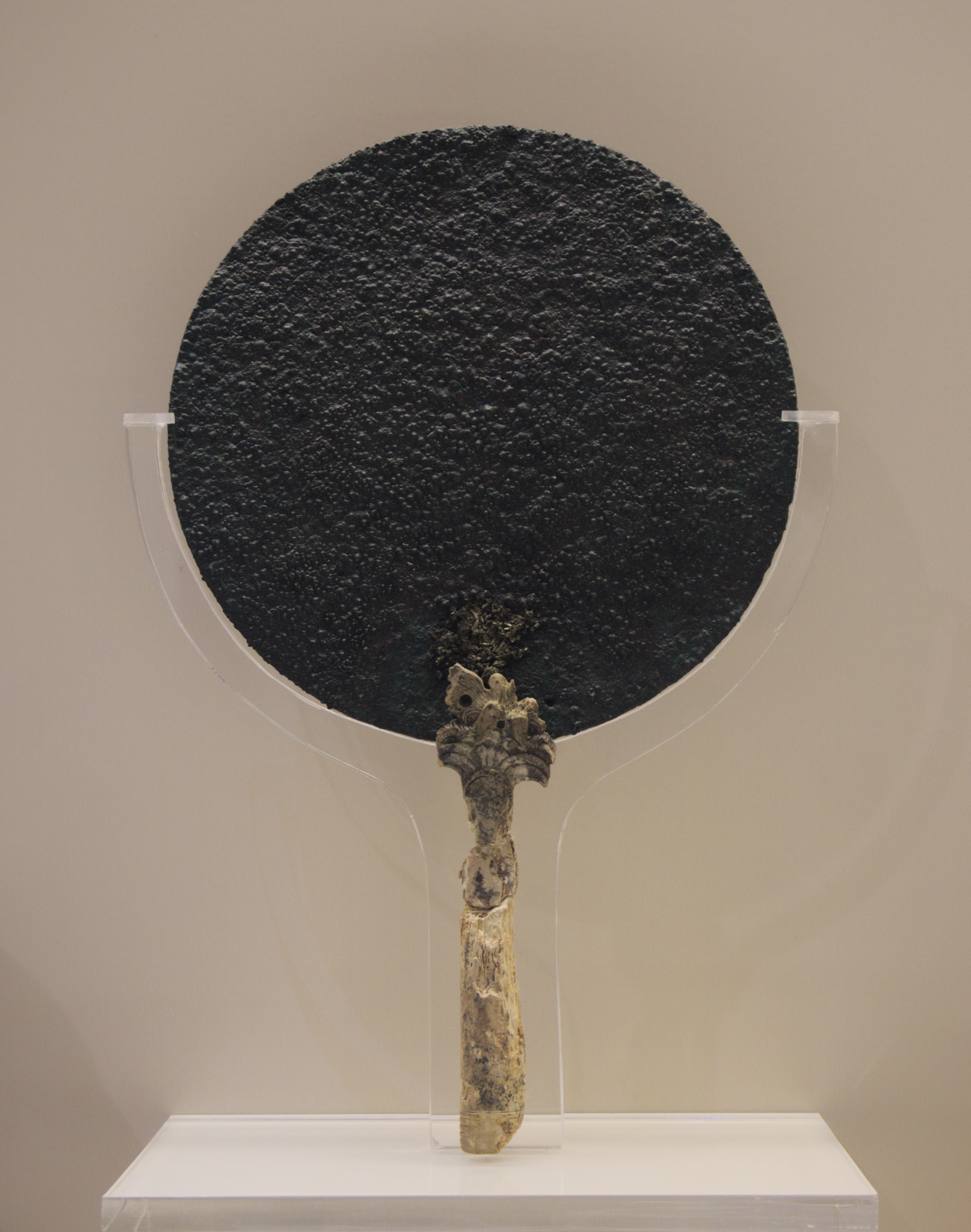
Bronze mirror with ivory handle, 1500-1350 BCE

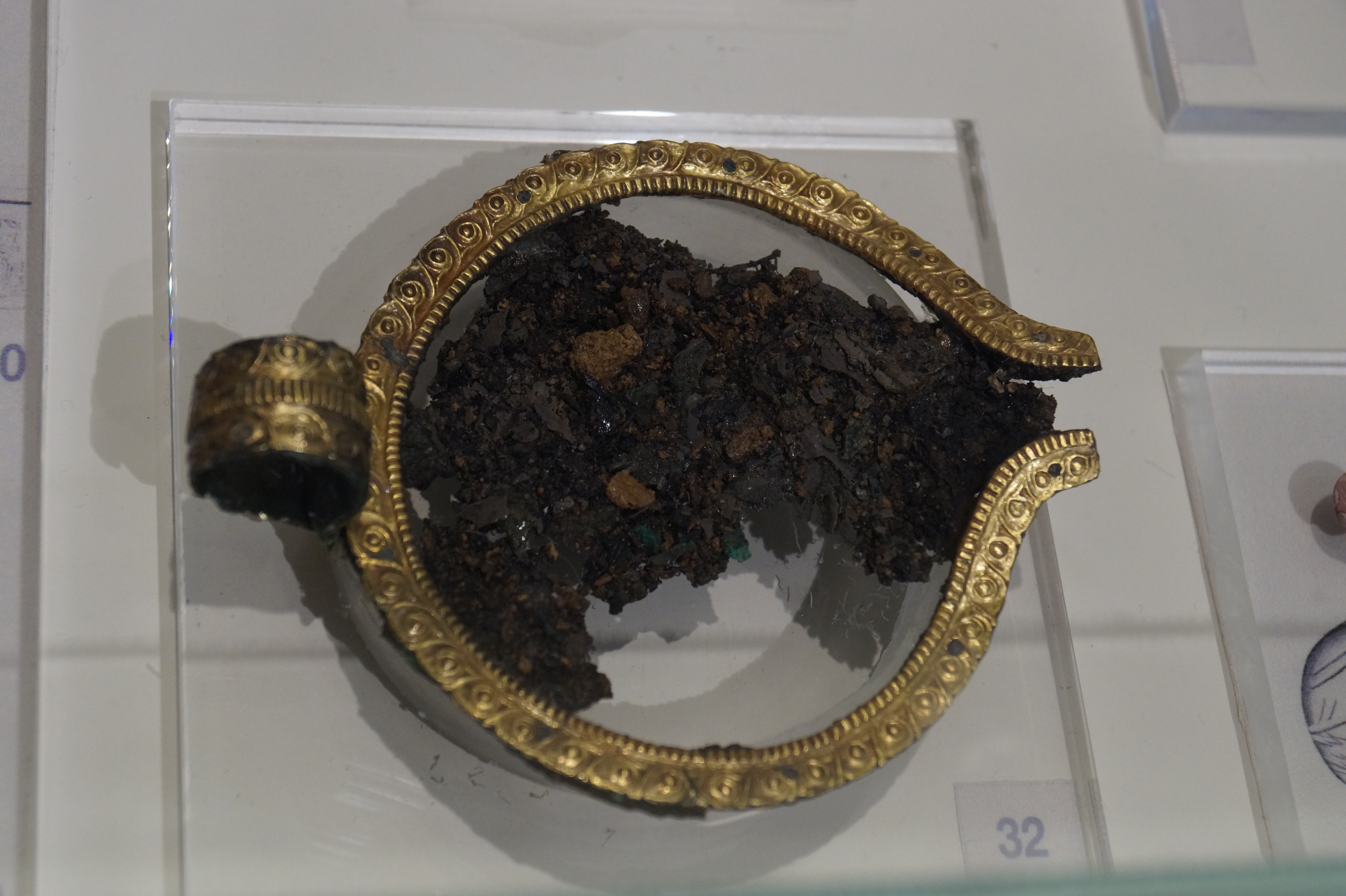
Silver cup with gold rim and handle from pit II of Kazarma Tholos Tomb (1500-1450 BCE)

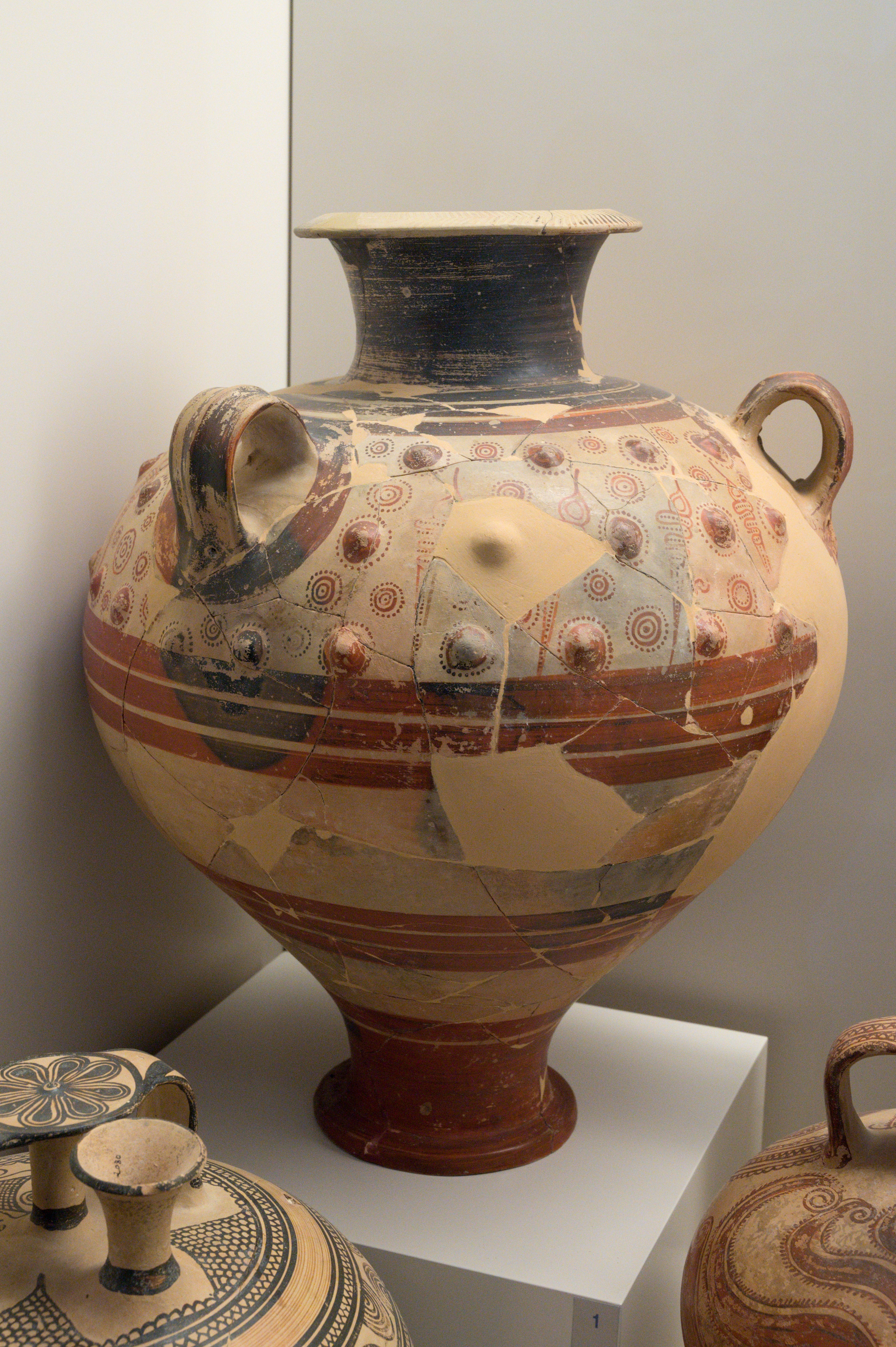
Piriform jar found in Asine (1350-1300 BCE)

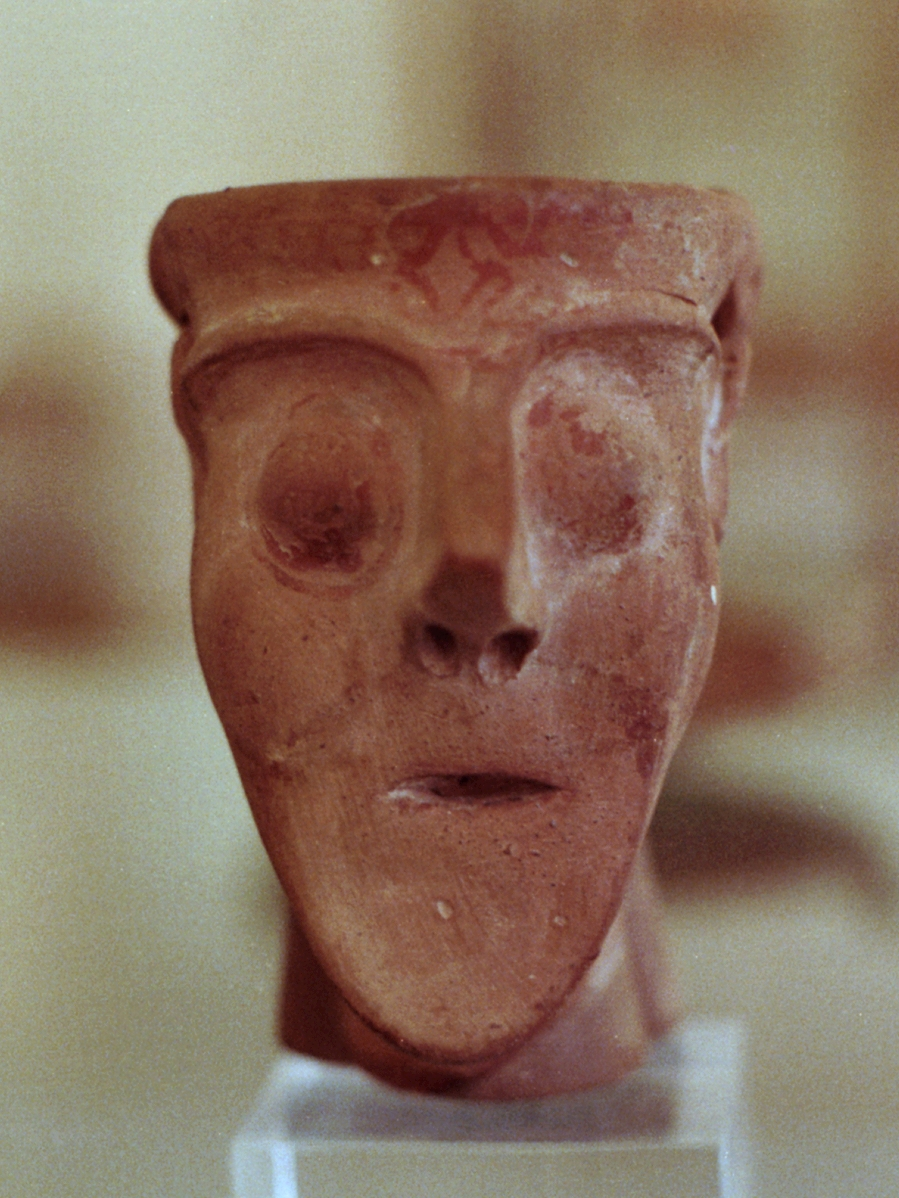
Lady of Asine 12th century BCE

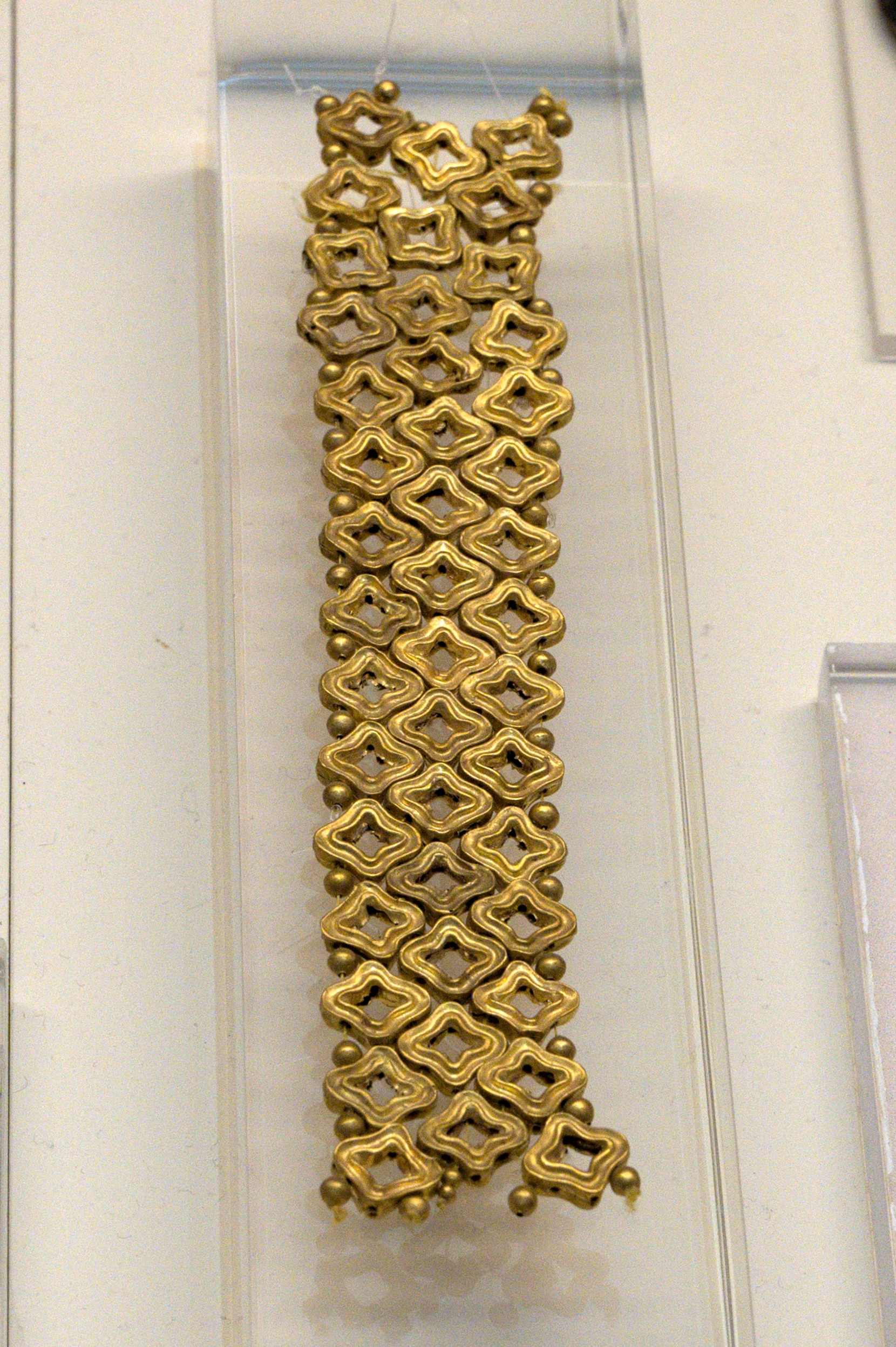
Gold beads, 1500-1350 BCE from Asine, Chamber Tomb I

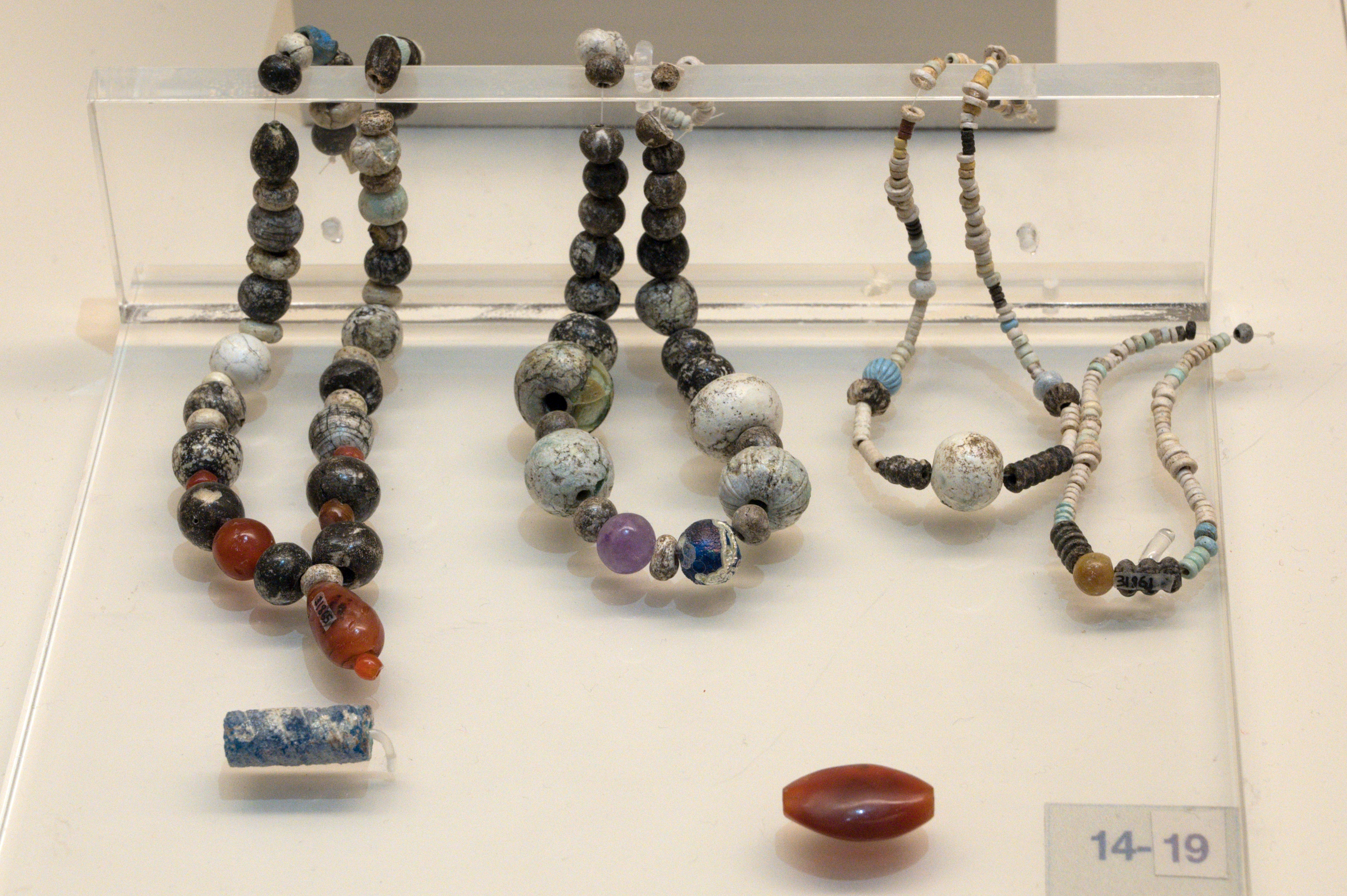
Glass, faience, amethyst and carnelian beads, 15th century BCE. Asine, Chambre Tomb V.

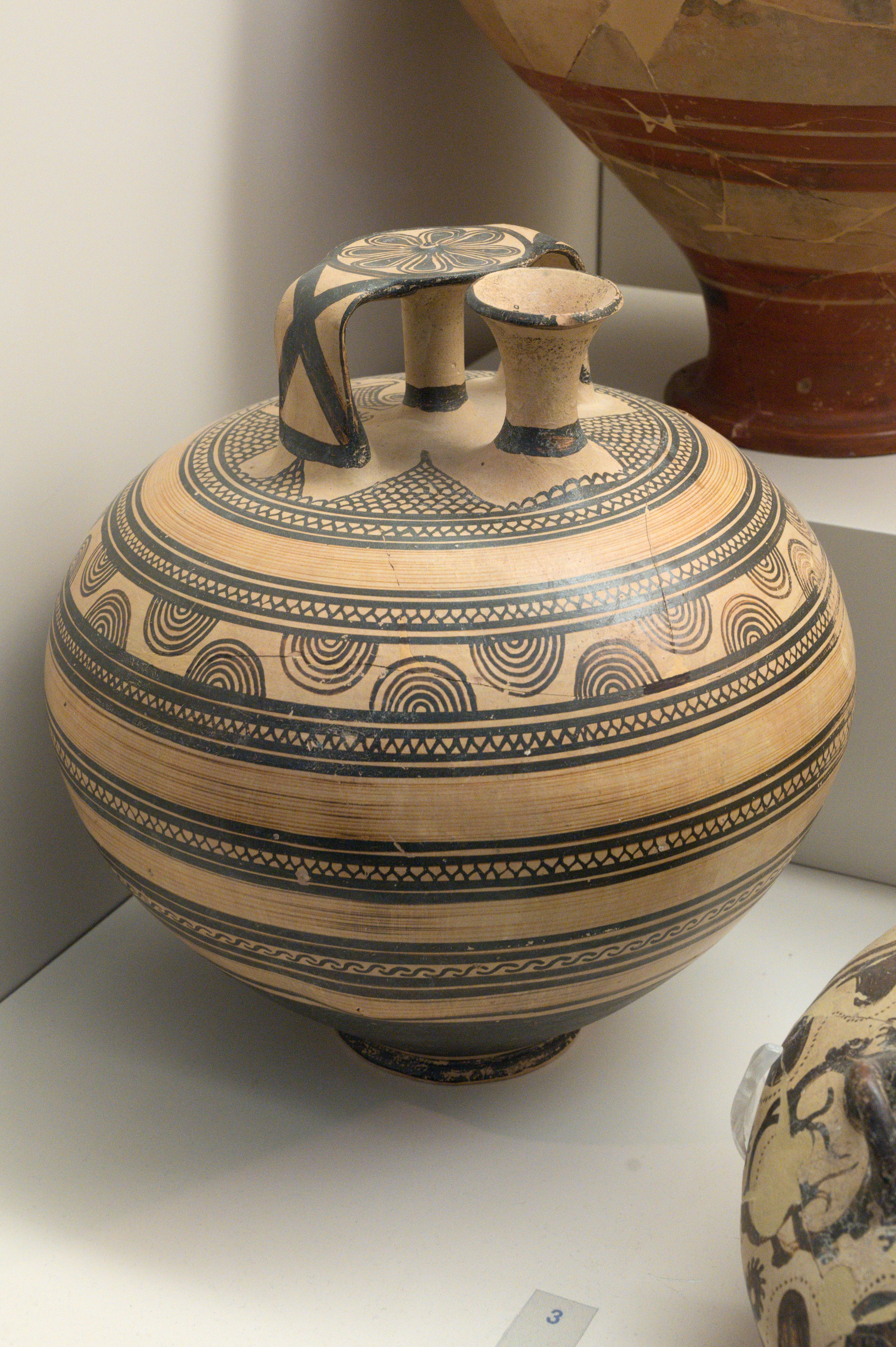
Stirrup jar from Asine 1150-1100 BCE

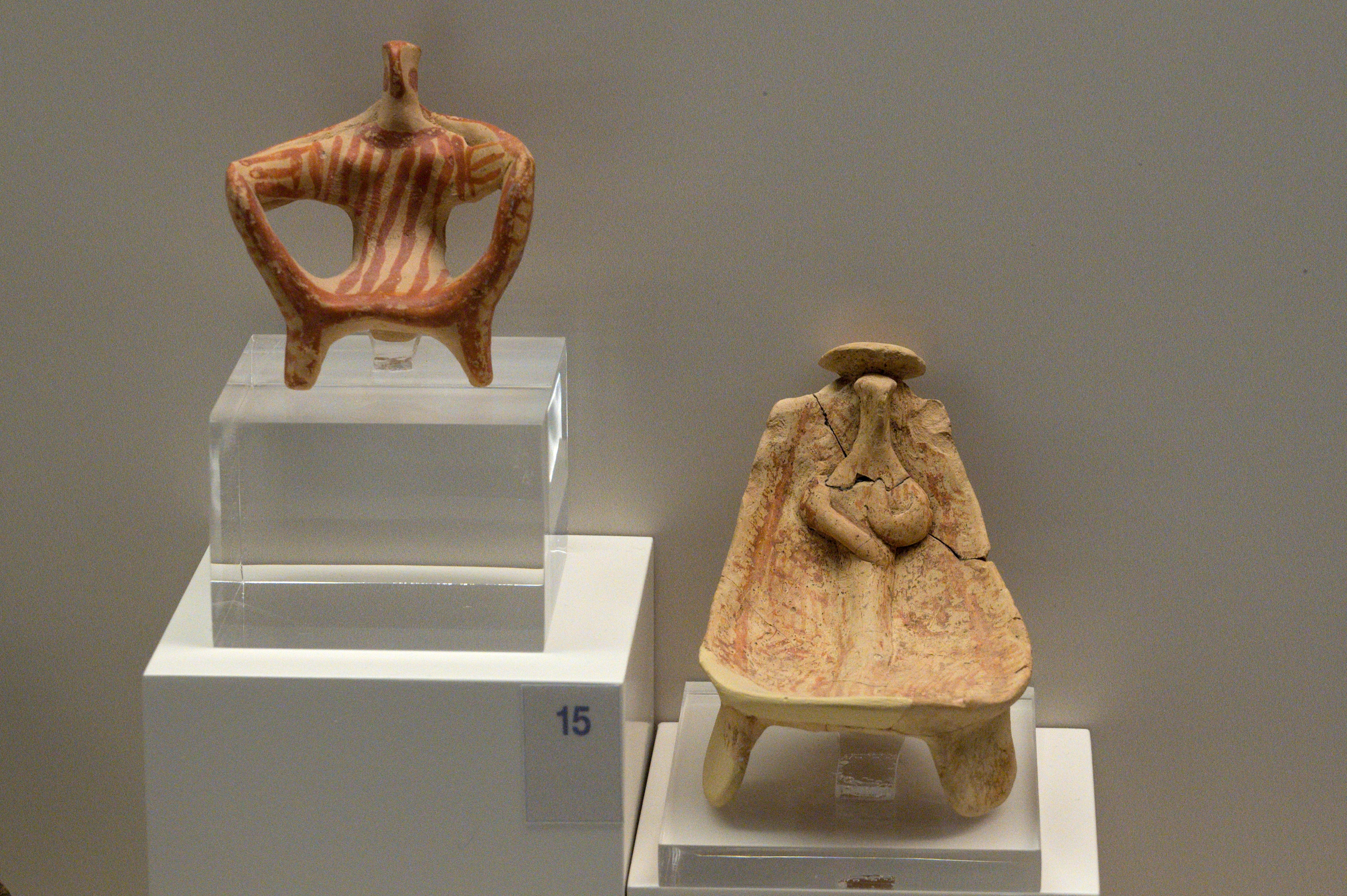
Enthroned bird goddesses from Palea Epidavros and Berbati, 1350-1300 BCE

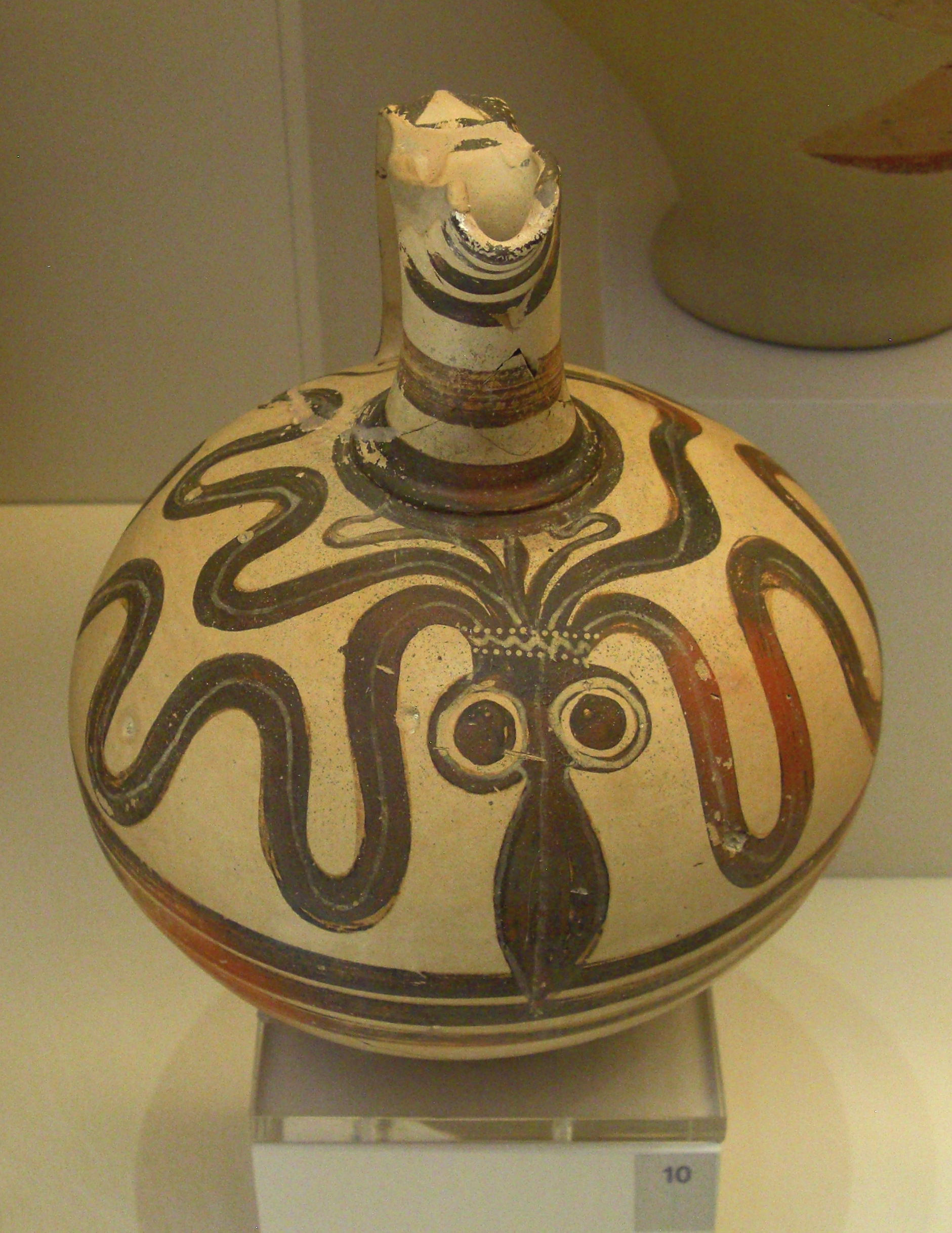
Beaked jug with octopus, Berbati, chamber tomb III, 1350-1300 BCE.

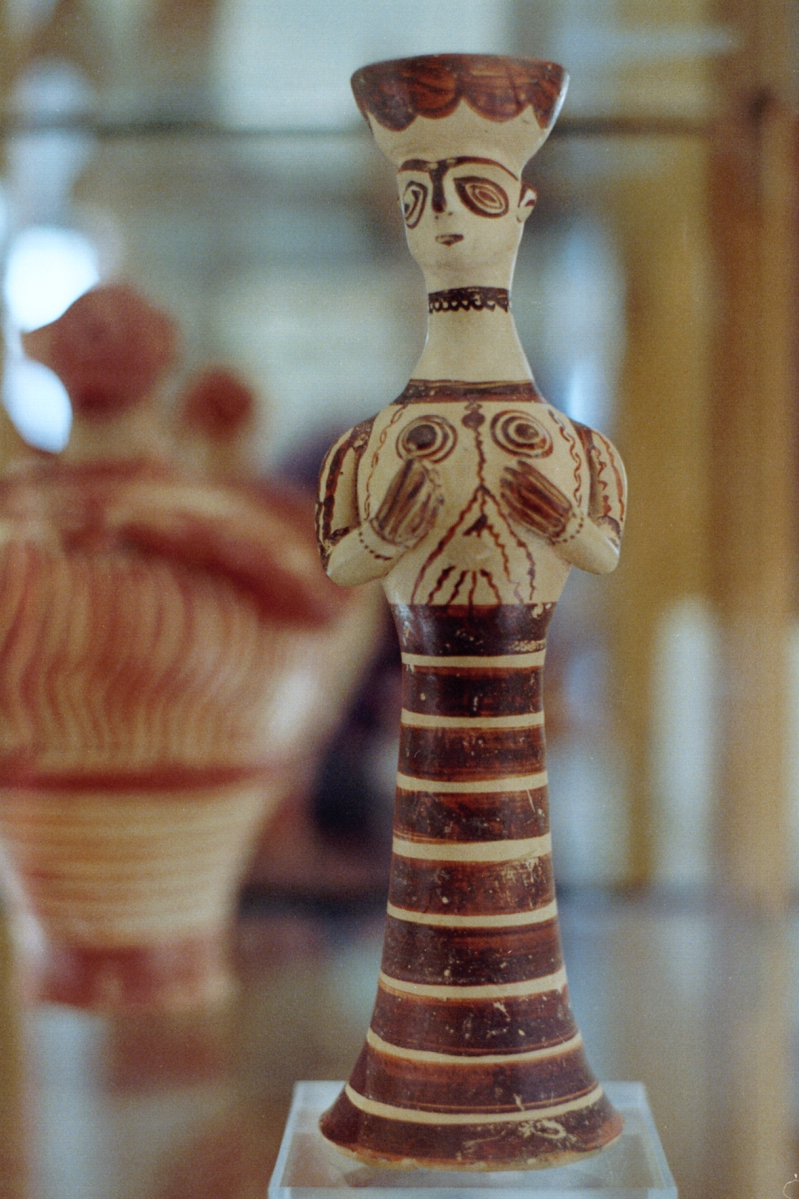
Terracotta Female figurine from Midea, 1250-1200 BCE

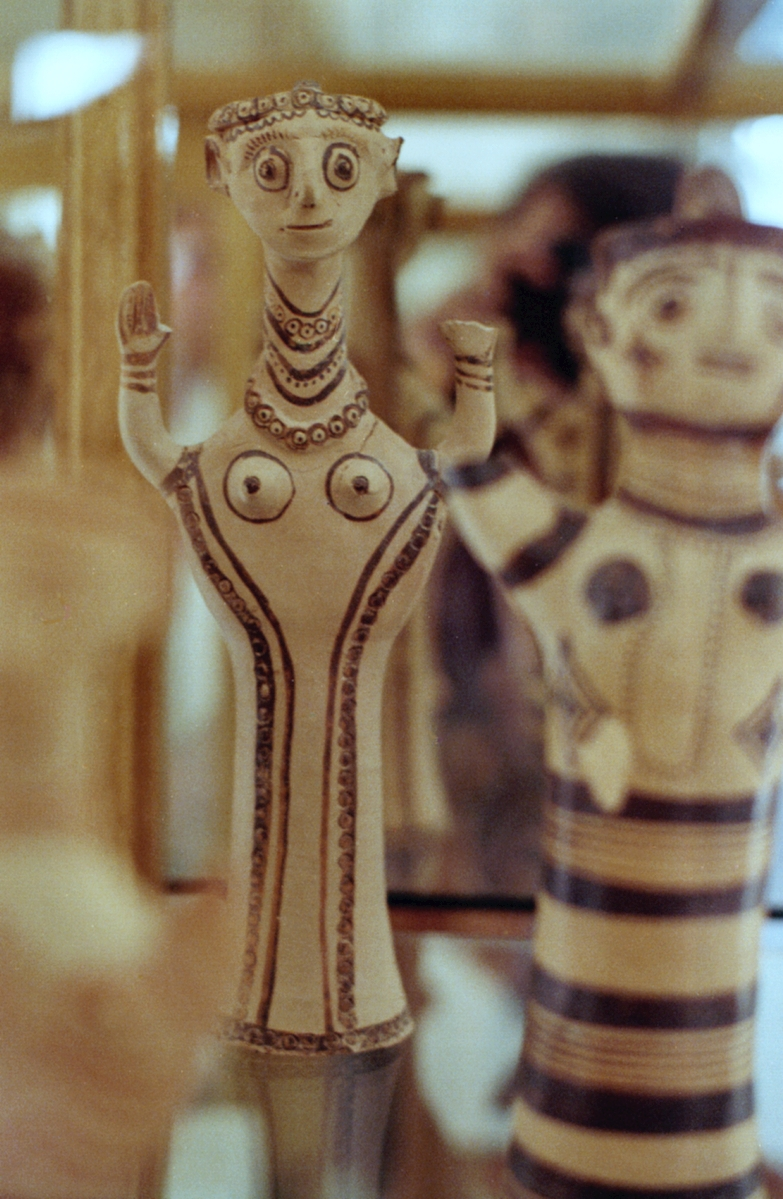
Terracotta Female figurine from Midea 12th century BCE

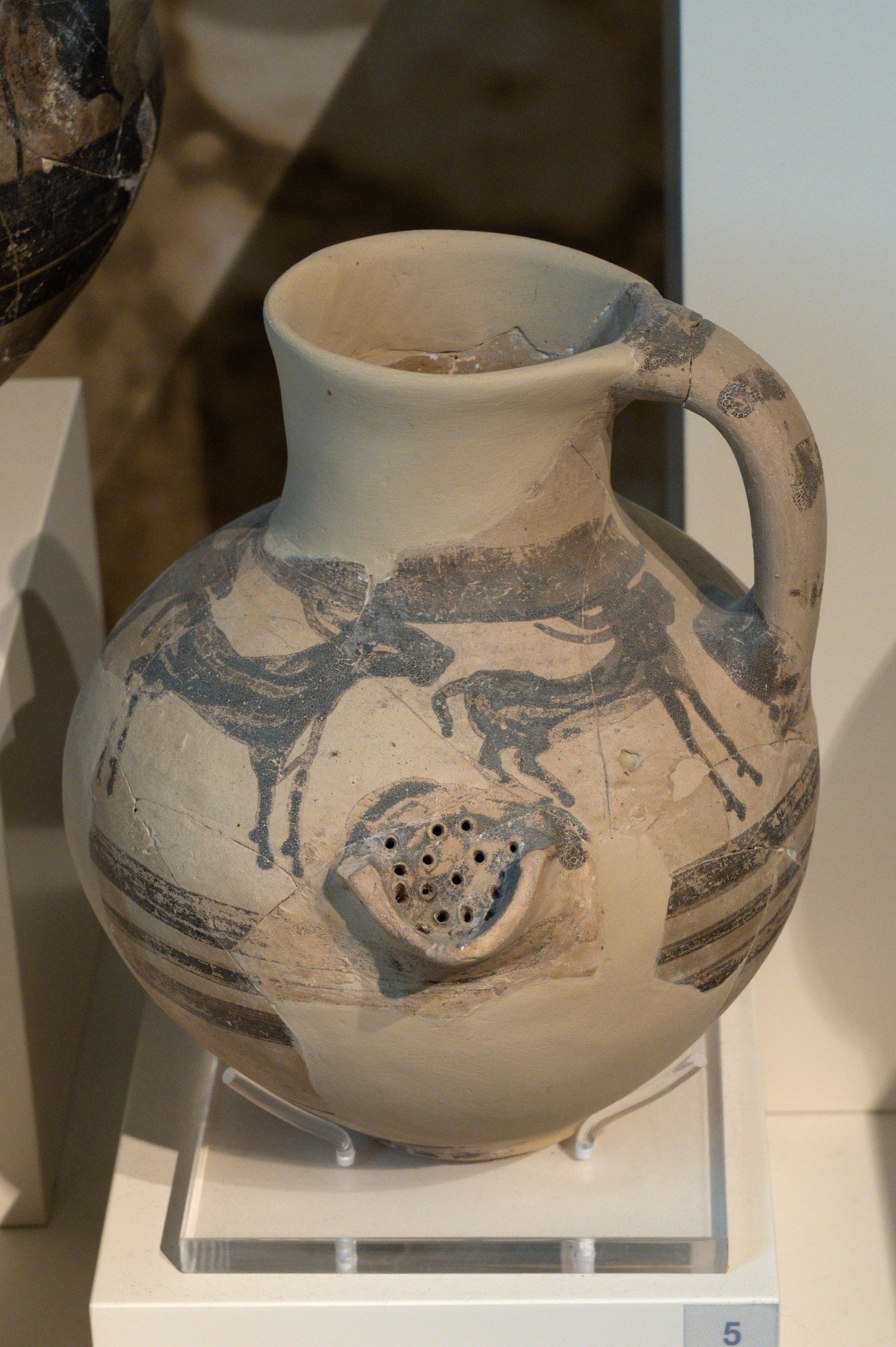
Strainer jug with bovids, Midea, 1250-1200 BCE

== Iron Age ==
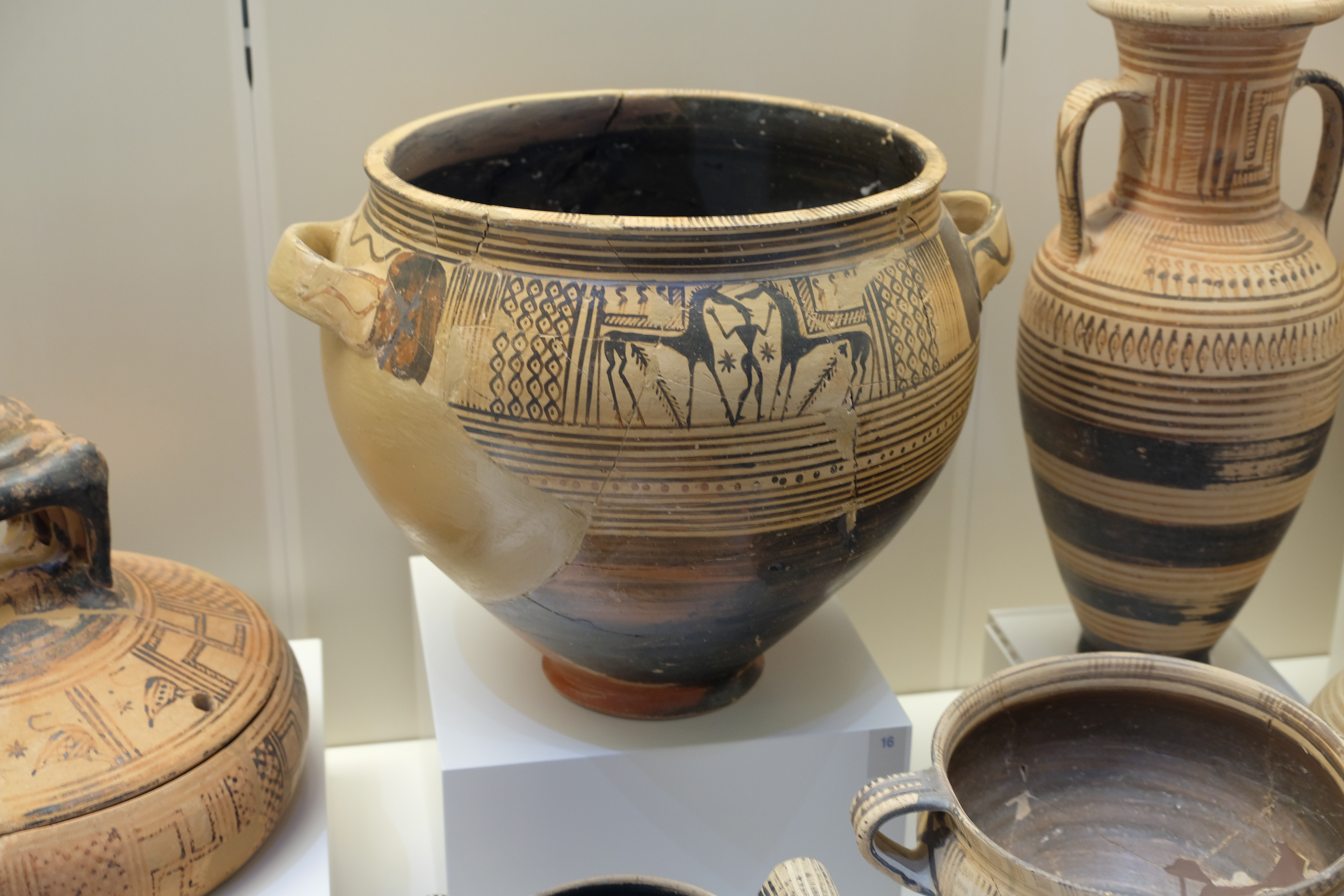
Krater with male figure and horses from Tiryns, grave XXIII, 730-690 BCE

The Iron Age is typically considered to have dawned in the wake of the Bronze Age collapse, in the 12th century BCE.In central and western Europe, it is considered to have ended with the Roman conquests of the 1st century BCE. The Iron Age did not start when iron first appeared in Europe but when it began to replace bronze in the preparation of tools and weapons. Weapons, implements, and utensils were no longer cast but hammered into shape and decoration became elaborate and curvilinear rather than simple rectilinear. A bronze helmet from an 11th century BCE Sub-Mycenaean tomb at Tiryns is an example in the museum of the craftsmanship from the early Iron Age. Pottery figurines and scenes of horses, warriors, boats, ritual dances, animals and birds from the age of Homer, recovered from tombs of Pronoia (Nafplion), Tiryns, Asine, and Berbati are examples of funerary art from the Geometric Period.

=== Archaic period ===
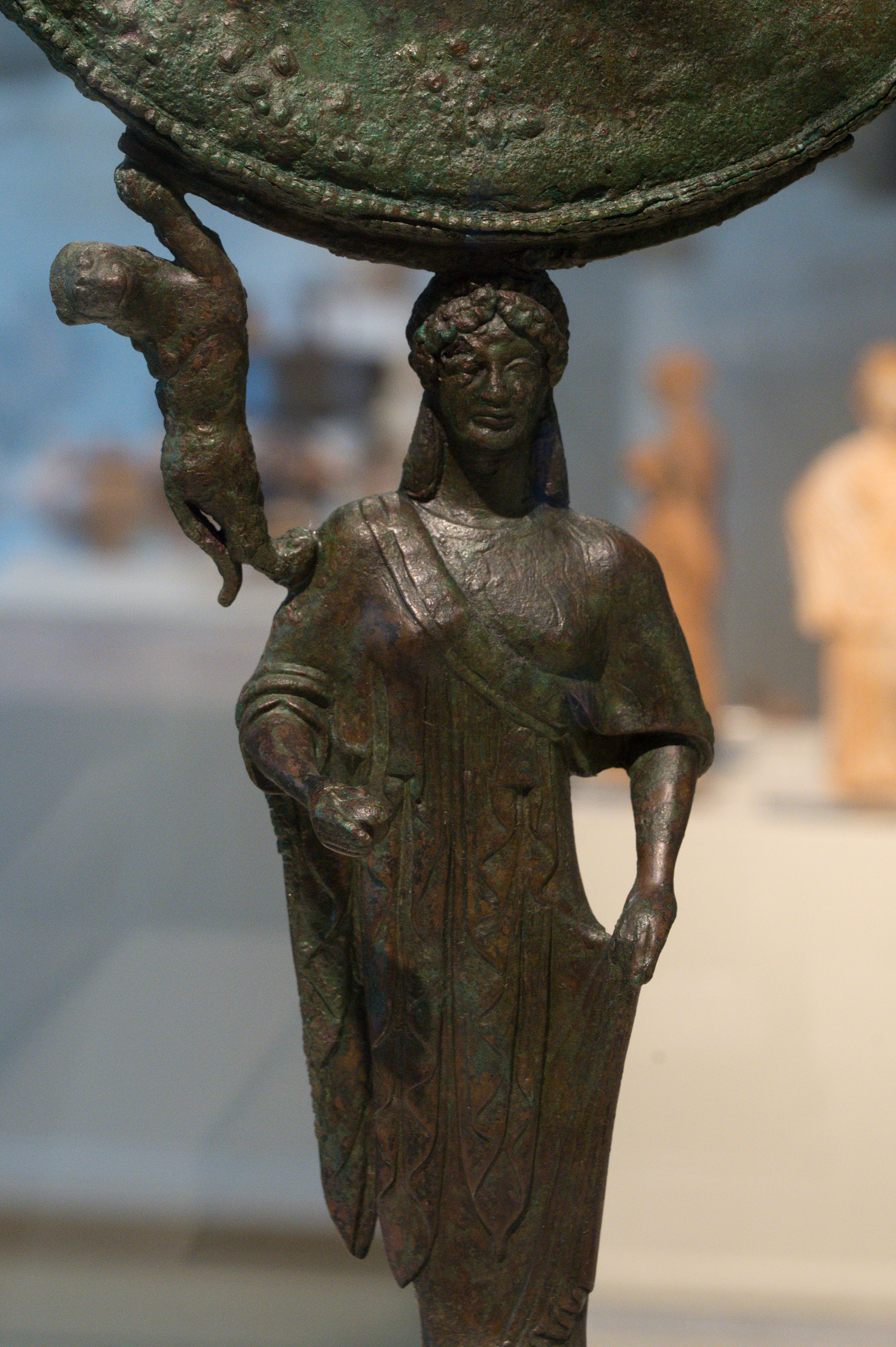
Bronze mirror, Caryatid, Halieis, 490-470 BCE

The Archaic period in Greece, 800 BCE - 480 BCE is represented as well by cult objects from a pit repository at Tiryns. Votive figurines of enthroned female deities, female votaries, miniature vases, flowers, fruits, and garlands are thought to have been offered in the worship of the goddess Hera. Bronze miniature helmets and greaves as well as the 7th century BCE terracotta votive shields and ritual masks may have been offerings to the goddess Athena. Finds from the ancient cities of Hermione and Halieis join artifacts from Epidauros and Asine in displays of objects from the 6th-5th centuries BCE. Items include clay and glass vases, figurines, gold jewelry, strigils, bronze mirrors, and utensils. Particularly noteworthy is a Kore figure (ca. 600 BCE) from the sanctuary of Artemis in Epidauros, a bronze Caryatid-type mirror (490-470 BCE) from Hermione, and bronze keys from the temple at Halieis.

=== Hermione ===
According to Greek mythology, Hermione was founded by the Dryopes who had fled Mount Oeta when attacked by Heracles. Unlike Asine, Hermione continued as an independent city long after the arrival of the Dorians and are recorded as sending three ships to the Battle of Salamis and 300 men to the Battle of Plataea during the Greco-Persian Wars. In 464 BCE, it came under the control of the Argives at the same time they subdued Mycenae and Tiryns. The people of Hermione later regained their independence and became an ally of Sparta. But after Aratus of Sicyon liberated Argos in 228 BCE, Hermione joined the Achaean League. By the 2nd century CE, though, it was abandoned. Hermione was the site of the sanctuary of Clymenus (a surname for Hades) where Hermionians believed an opening in the earth there was the shortest road to Hades. Consequently, unlike most Greeks, Hermionians put no money in the mouths of their dead to pay Charon, the ferryman of the underworld.

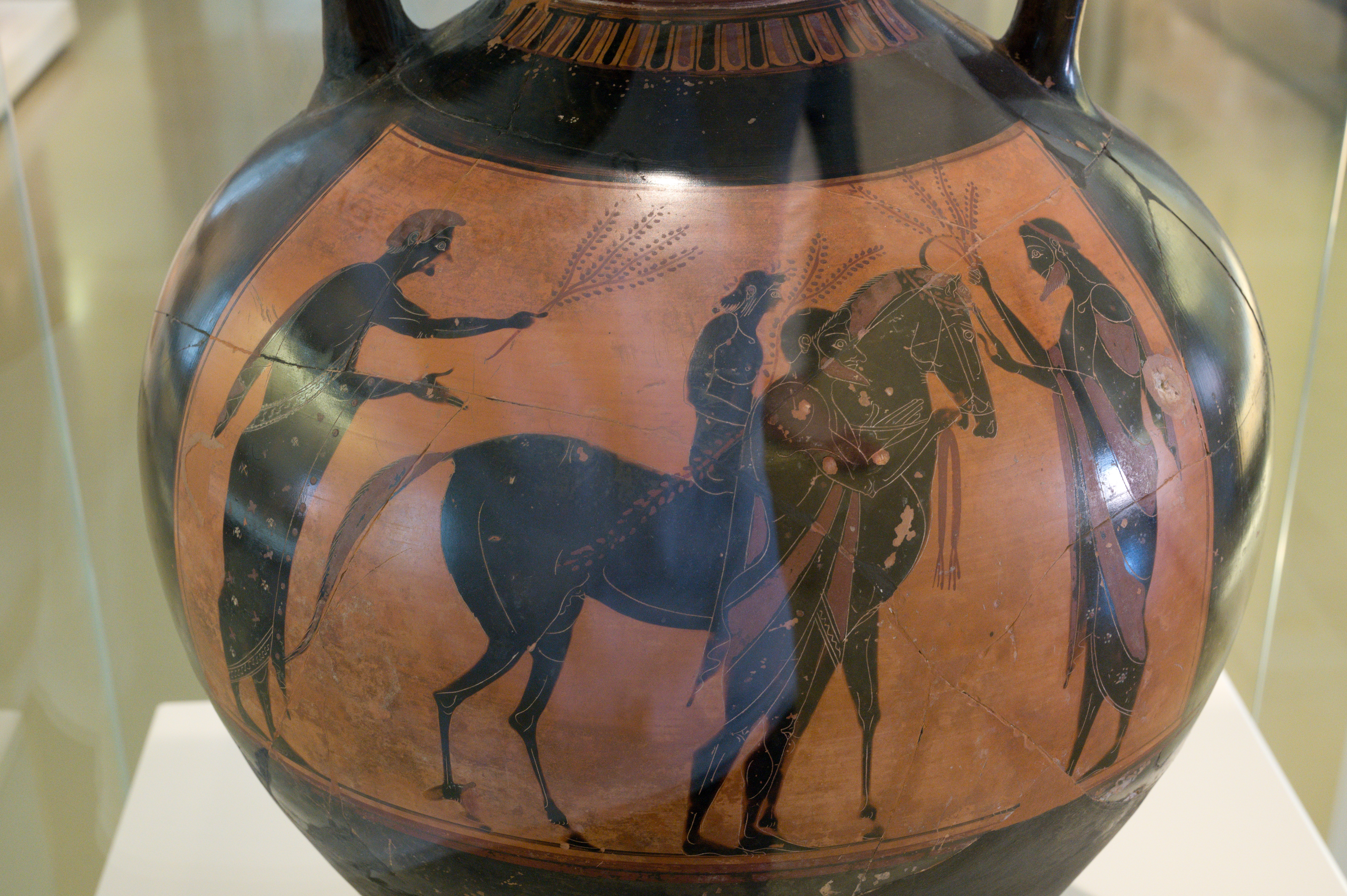
Panathenaic amphora, Mastos Painter, 530-520 BCE

=== Halieis ===
Halieis was a port town at the mouth of the Argolic Gulf. The Tirynthians and Hermionians took refuge at Halieis when they were expelled from their own cities by the Argives. In 460 BCE it was made a subject of Sparta. Subsequently it was ravaged repeatedly by the Athenians during the Peloponnesian War, although remains of its acropolis can still be seen. According to Pausanias, it, too, was abandoned by the 2nd century CE.

== Donations ==
Donors have supplemented the museum's collections with Attic, Boeotian, and Corinthian vases and figurines including a Panathenaic amphora by the Mastos Painter (530-520 BCE), an Attic red-figure hydria with a scene of Orestes murdering his mother, Clytemnestra dated to 440 BCE, and a Boeotian pseudo-red-figure Cabeirian skyphos (425-400 BCE) depicting Odysseus enjoying the hospitality of Circe in her palace on the island of Aeaea.

== See also ==
- List of museums in Greece
