= Prosymna =

Coordinates: 37°41′N 22°47′E

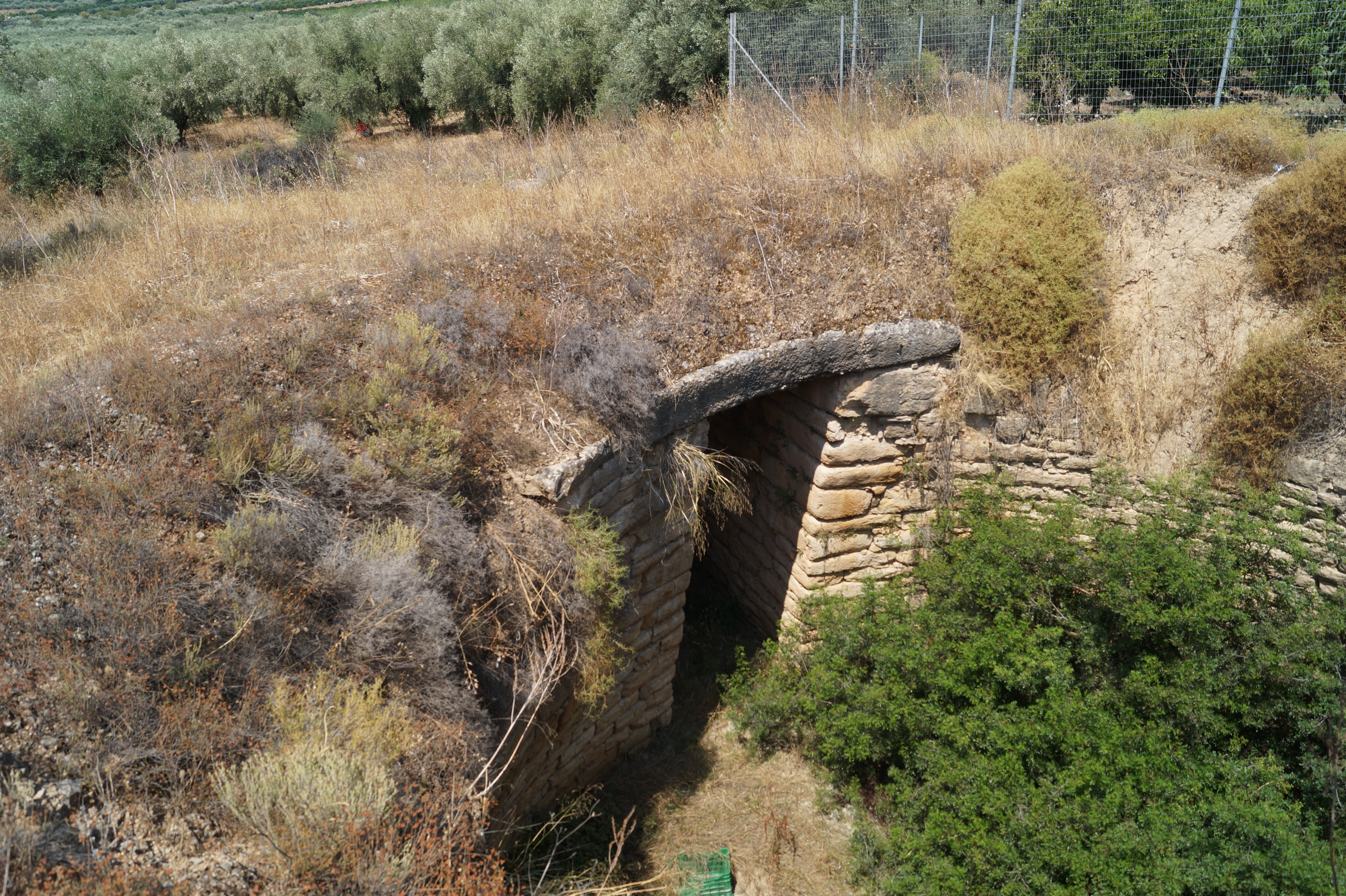
Beehive tomb found at Prosymna.

Prosymna (Ancient Greek: Πρόσυμνα) was a town in ancient Argolis, in whose territory the celebrated Heraeum, or temple of Hera, stood. Statius gives it the epithet "celsa." Pausanias mentions only a district of this name. According to Greek mythology, its name derives from a daughter of Asterion called Prosymna who, together with her sisters Acraea and Euboea, were wet-nurses of Hera.

== Archaeology ==
The place was inhabited since the Neolithic period. In 1878, the area of ancient Prosymna, Panagiotis Stamatakis found a beehive tomb that was built in the Mycenaean epoch and that was also reused in later periods. Archaeological investigations continued under the auspices of the Swedish Institute at Athens in the 1930s and then during the 1980s and 1990s that found two settlement areas on two different sides of the Mastos hill slope, belonging to the Early and Late Helladic periods, respectively. They have found chamber tombs and large amounts of pottery that testify that the place was an important center of production of this material for many centuries. During the Hellenistic period and the early and late Roman the area also experienced a boom.
