= Mastos =

Ancient Greek drinking vessel shaped like a woman's breast

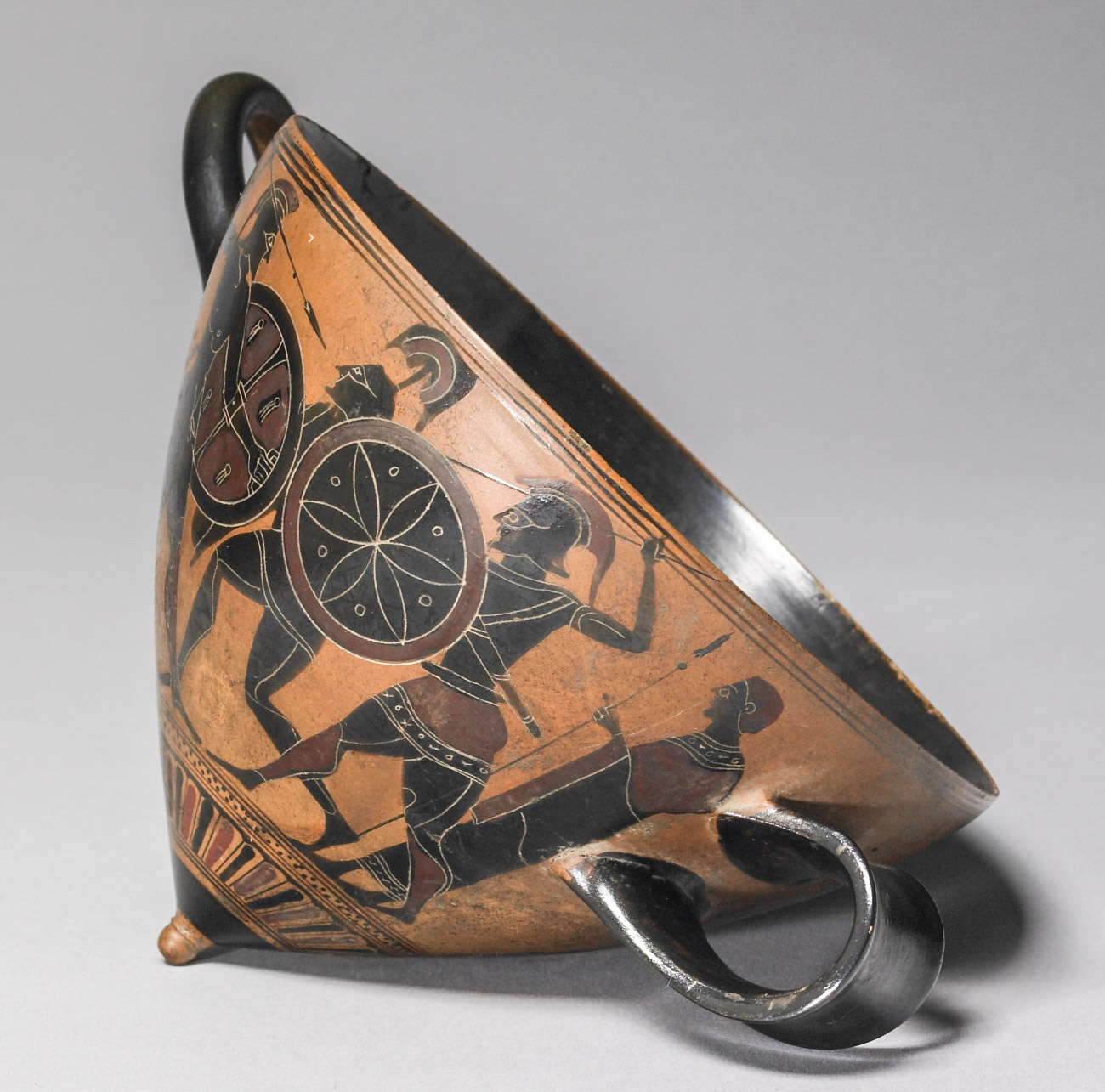
Black-figure mastos, ca. 530 BC, with combat scenes (Walters Art Museum)

A mastos (Greek, μαστός, "breast"; plural mastoi) is an ancient Greek drinking vessel shaped like a woman's breast. The type is also called a parabolic cup, and has parallel examples made of glass or silver. Examples are primarily in black-figure or white ground technique, though early examples may be red-figure. A mastos typically has two handles and a "nipple" at the bottom, though some examples have a foot as a base instead. A mastoid cup is conical, but with a flat bottom, with or without handles.

The handles of a mastos may be paired horizontally, but they may also be arranged with one horizontal, and one vertical like the handle of a mug. The vertical handle would have facilitated drinking from the relatively deep vessel, in contrast to the more shallow kylix. Having one handle turned at a different angle may also have been a device for hanging the cup when it had the pointed base.

In some archaeological contexts, the breast-like shape of the cup suggests ritual functions. Mastoi and votive representations of breasts are found as offerings (vota) at sanctuaries of deities such as Diana and Hercules, both of whom in ancient Roman religion had functions pertaining to birth, nursing, and rearing children. The dedications were sometimes made by wet nurses. The breast-shaped cup may have a religious significance; the drinking of breast milk by an adult who is elderly or about to die symbolized potential rebirth in the afterlife. In the Etruscan tradition, the goddess Juno (Uni) offers her breast to Hercules as a sign that he may enter the ranks of the immortals.

== See also ==
- Mastos Painter
- Eye-cup
