= Prosymna (mythology) =

Character in Greek mythology

In Greek mythology, Prosymna (Ancient Greek: Πρόσυμνα, romanized: Prósumna from prosymneô meaning 'celebrate in song') was one of the Argive daughters of the river-god Asterion. She and her sisters, Acraea and Euboea, were the nurses of Hera. The town of Prosymna which is beneath Heraion was named after the nymph.
