= Mastos Painter =

Ancient Greek vase painter

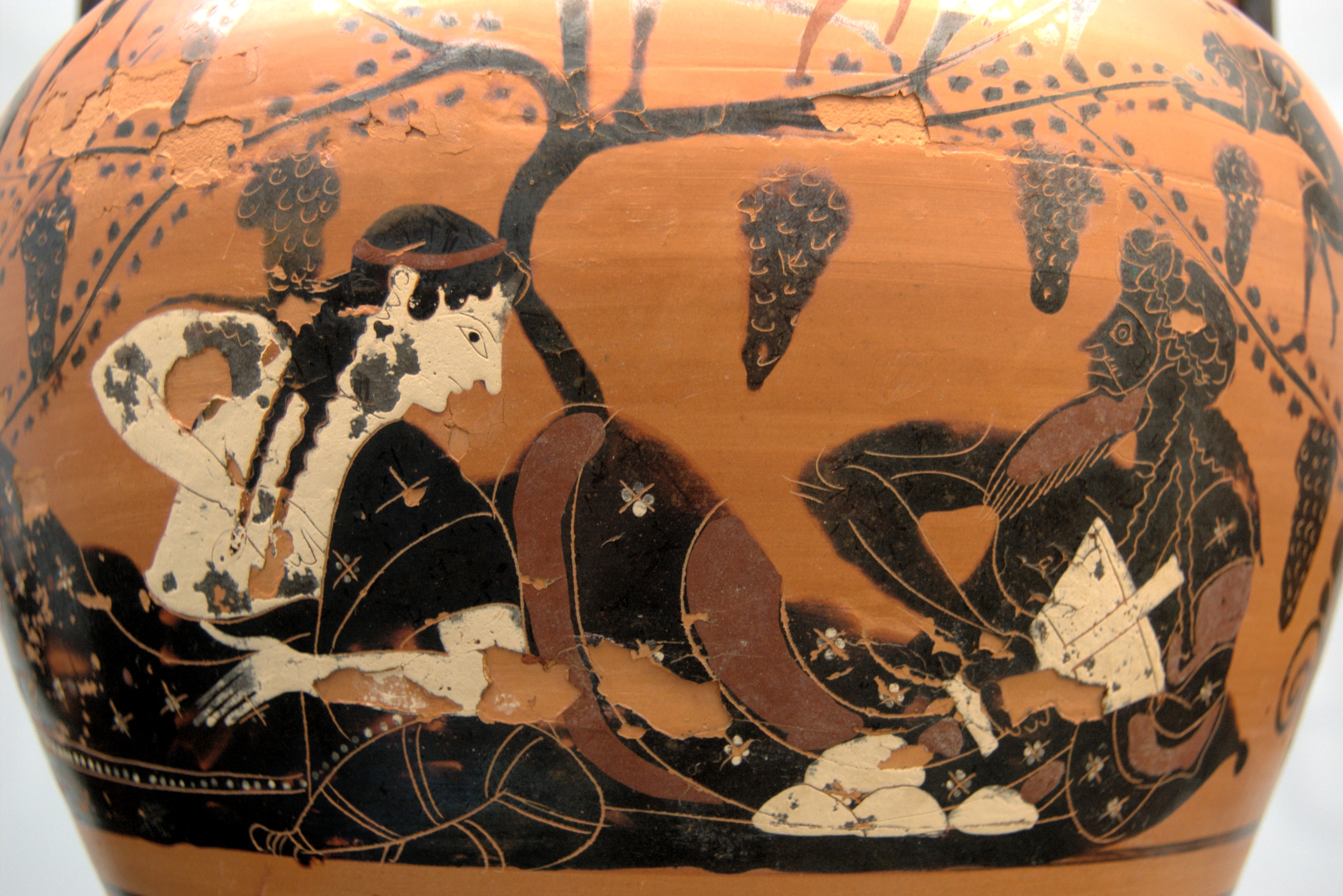
Dionysus and consort, possibly Ariadne, on an amphora by the Mastos Painter

The Mastos Painter (fl. mid-6th century BC) was a painter of ancient Greek vases. He is named for a black-figure mastos used by the art historian John Boardman to illustrate the type, which is shaped like a woman's breast (Greek mastos).

== Works ==
The Mastos Painter belonged to the circle of the Lysippides Painter. The work for which he was named depicts Dionysus, two horse-legged satyrs or silens, and Hermes as they "gaze admiringly" at Ariadne holding the infant Oinopion, her child with Dionysus. This "gentle kind of narrative" is characteristic also of the Antimenes Painter, the mature work of the Andokides Painter, and Oltos and Epiktetos around 515 BC.

Although the painter takes his name from his exemplary mastos, he also produced work on other vase types. On a belly amphora executed around 525 BC, he depicts an ivy-bearing Dionysus bringing his mother Semele from the underworld; the god looks back at her as she climbs into a chariot drawn by the magnificent pair of horses who dominate the scene. Hermes, wearing his characteristic petasos hat, carries branches of foliage as he accompanies the horses. Three bearded horse-tailed satyrs of varying size fill out the composition. The largest leaps in amazement on the chariot-shaft, looking back at the recovered Semele; another stands shoulder-height before the horses as he plays an aulos, the double-pipe wind instrument. A third, the smallest figure in the group, stoops beneath the horses, one hand extended toward their bellies and the other grasping his phallus.

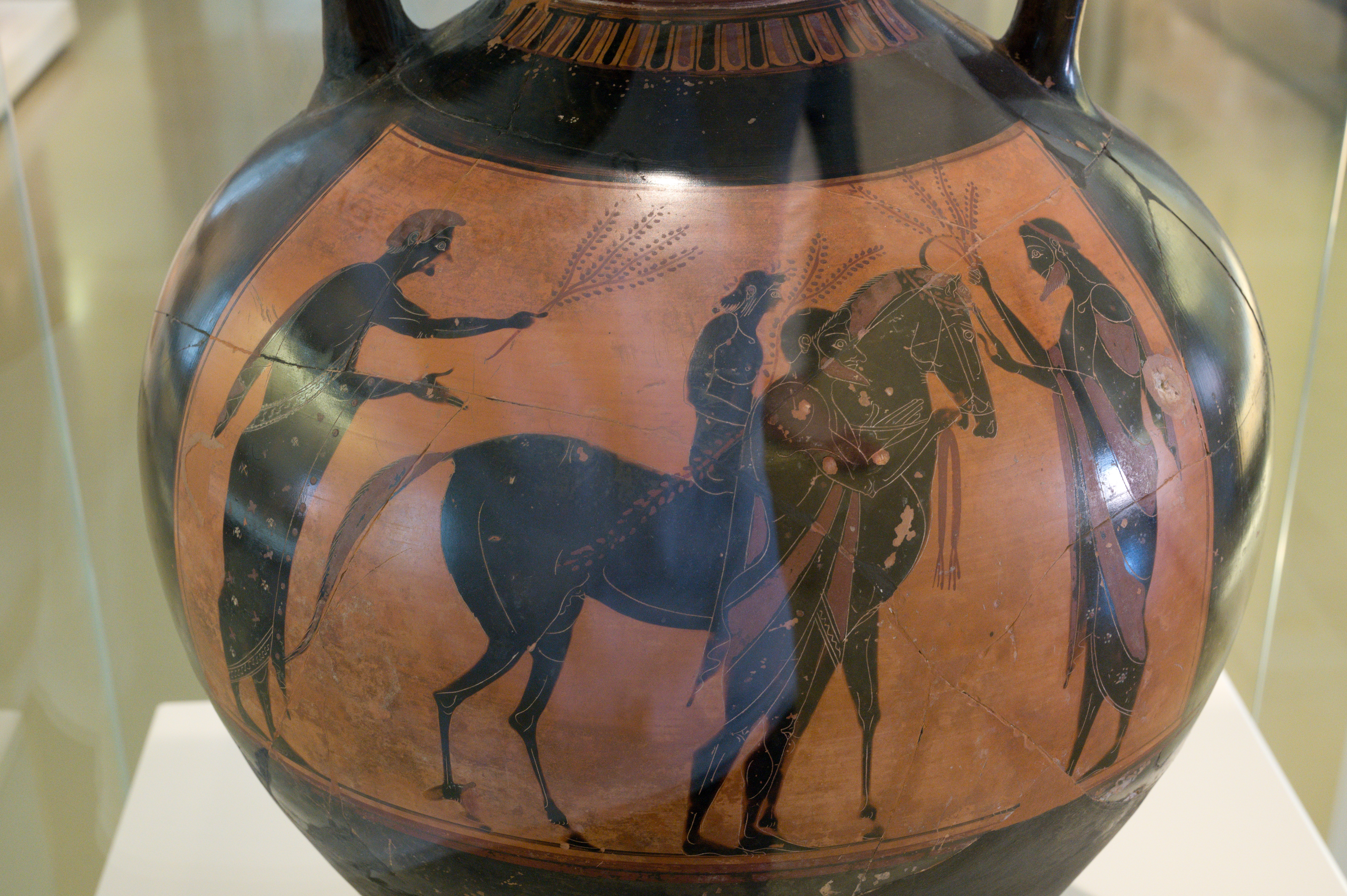
Panathenaic amphora by the Mastos Painter (530–520 BC). Archaeological Museum of Nafplion

The artistry has been characterized as "gently rounded" and allusive, elastic in its articulation. The female figure has also been identified as Ariadne.

The Mastos Painter also depicts a Panathenaic victory procession on what has been identified as a genuine prize amphora. The scene depicts the winning horse in a race, mounted by the nude boy-jockey holding a pair of branches. An elaborately clothed man stands in front of the horse, patting its muzzle and holding a wreath and branches. He may represent the owner, who would have been considered the victor. The man who stands beside the horse, holding its bridle, is perhaps the trainer. A third well-clad man holding branches stands behind the horse.

The Mastos Painter has also been credited with a black-figure vase depicting the pankration.
