= Asterion (god) =

River-god of Argos

In Greek mythology, Asterion (/əˈstɪəriən/; Ancient Greek: Ἀστερίων, gen.: Ἀστερίωνος, literally "starry") was a river-god of Argos.

== Family ==
Asterion was presumably one of the sons of Oceanus and Tethys. He had three daughters, Euboea, Prosymna, and Acraea, who were the nurses of Hera.

== Mythology ==
Asterion was one of the three river-gods (the other two being Inachus and Cephisus) who awarded the territory of Argolis to Hera over Poseidon. Poseidon, in anger, made the waters of all three rivers disappear so that they don't flow unless it rains, and are dry in summer.

The River Asterion in Argos is mentioned in the Dionysiaca of Nonnus, who couples the reference with a rite in which young men dedicate locks of their hair.

Asterion in the herbal of Dioscurides, is Silene linifolia. Of this herb, found near the Heraion of the Argolid, Pausanias noted "On its banks grows a plant, which also is called asterion. They offer the plant itself to Hera, and from its leaves weave her garlands."
