= Acraea =

Several individuals in Greek and Roman mythology

Acraea (Ancient Greek: Ἀκραία, romanized: Akraia, lit. 'of the heights', 'dwelling on the heights' or 'at the edge/ extreme') was a name that had several uses in Greek and Roman mythology.

- Acraea, the naiad daughter of the river-god Asterion near Mycenae, who together with her sisters Euboea and Prosymna acted as nurses to Hera. A hill opposite the temple of Hera near Mycenae was named Acraea for her.
- Acraea and Acraeus are also epithets given to various goddesses and gods whose temples were situated upon hills, including Zeus, Hera, Aphrodite, Athena and Artemis.
