= Kanathos =

Spring where Hera annually renewed her virginity

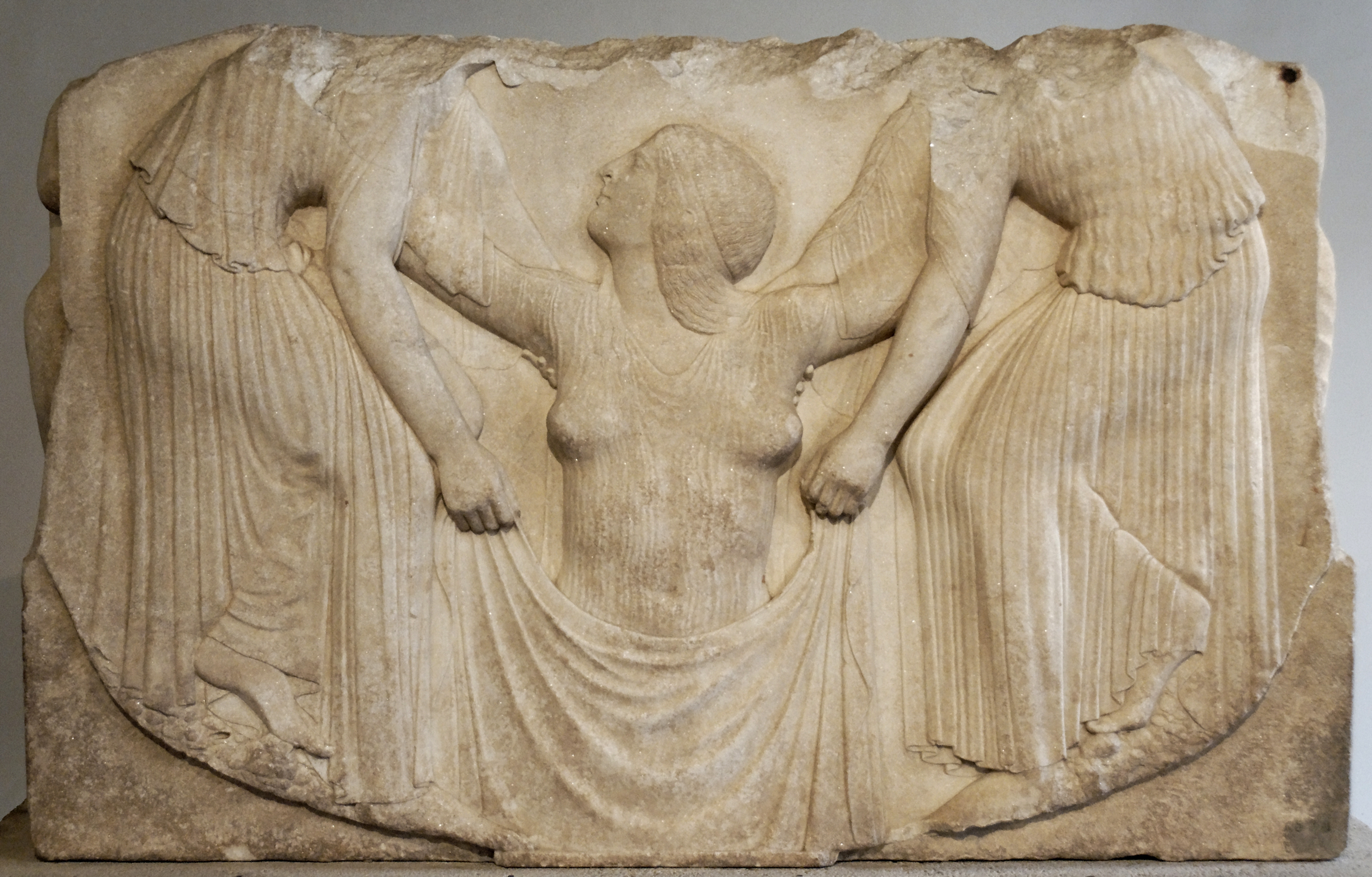
So-called “Ludovisi Throne” main panel, which may represent Hera bathing at Kanathos or Aphrodite bathing at Paphos.

In ancient Greek religion, Kanathos (Greek: Κάναθος) in the Argolid was the spring at Nauplia, where Hera annually renewed her virginity. There, Pausanias noted, was "a spring called Kanathos where, so say the Argives, Hera bathes every year and, by so doing, becomes a maiden; it is this story which is of the secrets connected with the rites which they perform to Hera." The unspoken nature of the ritual forbade its being embodied openly or directly in Greek mythology. S. Casson suggested that it was the obscure subject of the so-called "Ludovisi Throne", generally considered to represent the parallel, and far better-known, renewal of Aphrodite, bathing in the sea at Paphos.

At Samos, the ritual bathing of the goddess was represented in cult thus: the archaic wooden cult image of Hera at Samos, originally an iconic plank of wood, or xoanon, was taken out annually and ritually washed in the sea, for which an aiton was offered in the form of a mythic anecdote. "The bathing of a statue of a goddess is a commemorative re-enactment of the bath which the goddess took herself", G. W. Elderkin remarked of the bathing rituals of Aphrodite's priestess called the loutrophoros, "carrier of the washing-water".

For Jane Ellen Harrison, simply recalling that a triple Hera, perhaps of Pelasgian origin, was venerated at Stymphalos in Arcadia as maiden child, wife and even widow, was sufficient "to enable us to recognize in her the year-goddess in the three Greek seasons, spring, summer-autumn and winter. At Nauplia too (Pausanias ii.38.2), year after year she renewed, as every year-deity must, her youth and maiden-hood by bathing in the Kanathos. The exclusive matron-hood, familiar to us in the Iliad, is but one aspect, emphasized to complete the literary Olympian family circle."

The water of the Eleutherion by the Heraion of Argos was also used for ritual bathing.

== See also ==
- Ablution (disambiguation)
- Ritual washing
- Nerthus: ritual washing of a Germanic Mother Earth, from Tacitus, Germania.
- Cybele, ritual washing of her cult image at Rome: see Ovid's Fasti.
