= Barberini Hera =

Roman sculpture

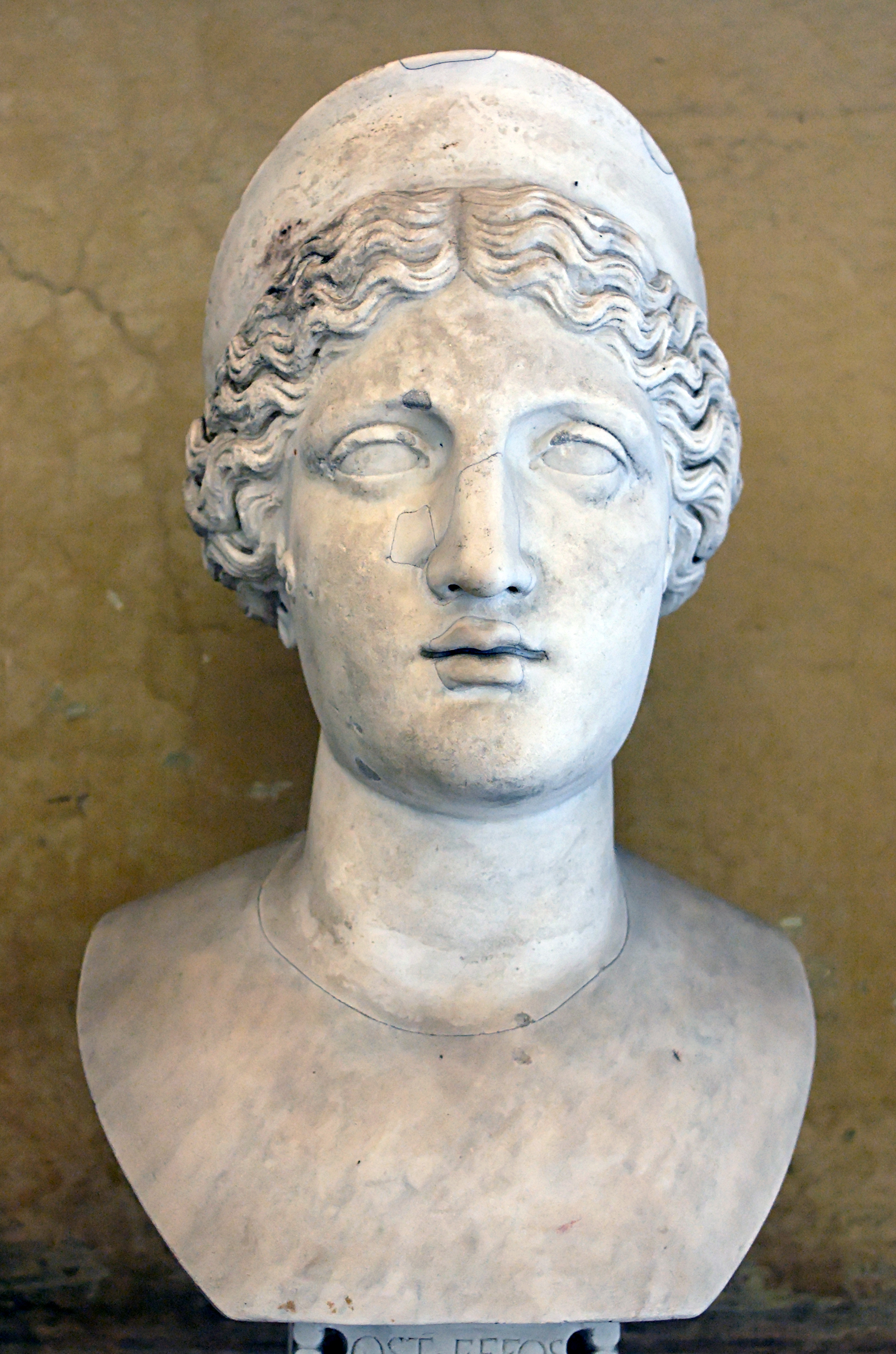
Head of the Barberini Hera type (Museo Chiaramonti, Vatican Museums)

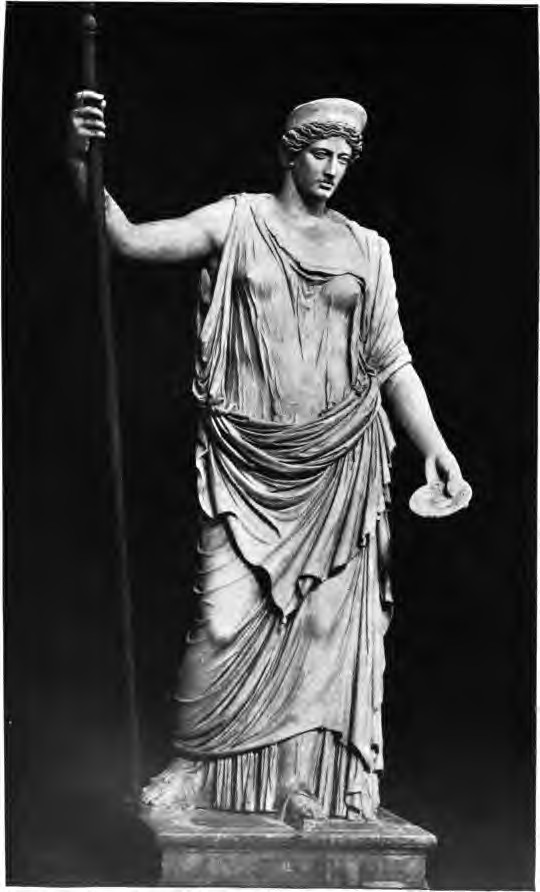
The Barberini Hera (Museo Pio-Clementino, Vatican Museums)

The Barberini Hera, also known as Barberini Juno, is a Roman sculpture believed to be a copy of a Greek original depicting either Hera or Juno, two prominent goddesses in ancient mythology. Unearthed in Rome during the late 17th century, this sculpture now resides in the Museo Pio-Clementino.

== Description ==
The statue depicts the goddess standing, wearing a crown and peplos (which clings to show her form beneath and has dropped from her left shoulder, nearly revealing her breast) and now resting the weight of her restored right arm on a standing sceptre and carrying a patera in her left. This sculpture is a Roman copy of a Greek original, possibly by Alcamenes; Lewis Richard Farnell suggested that "the not infrequent repetition of the type suggests a Greek original of some celebrity." It is now in the Museo Pio-Clementino in the Vatican Museums. It is also sometimes identified as a Ceres. The right arm and the nose are restorations.

The Museum of Fine Arts in Budapest, who have a plaster copy, believe that the sculptor was Agorakritos from Paros and that the original was created in the fifth century. They speculate that if is not Hera then it may be the Greek goddess of fortune (Tyche) or the goddess of love (Aphrodite).

== Discovery ==
The sculpture was discovered by the antiquarian Leonardo Agostini in the late 17th century, during excavations on the Viminal Hill. The site was located beneath the convent affiliated with the church of San Lorenzo in Panisperna, an area known to have hosted the ancient Baths of Olimpiades. Its identification as the Barberini Hera was established by its early owner, Cardinal Francesco Barberini.
