= Hera Borghese =

Type of sculpture

The Hera Borghese is a type of sculpture of Hera named after the owners of its archetype, the Borghese family.

One example is in the National Museum of Rome, whilst others are in the Palatine Antiquarium and at the Castello Aragonese Museum at Baiae.

== Hera Borghese ==
The namesake statue for this archetype is made of marble has been dated to the 2nd century AD. It was excavated (alongside many other statues) from a large Roman villa near Monte Calvo in 1824–26. The villa belonged C. Brutius Presens who was a prominent figure during the reign of emperors Trajan and Hadrian. Afterwards the statue was taken to Rome and exhibited at the Villa Borghese.

Inherited by a succession of Borgheses until the latter part of the 19th century it had been removed from public view and stored in the basement of the Villa Borghese for many years. The Borgheses having some financial difficulties were interested in selling some of their works of art and in 1891 it was acquired by Wolfgang Helbig for the Carlsberg Glyptotek. Since the purchase of the Hera Borghese was subject to some discretion, codenames were employed, in the case of the Hera it was called "Jeanette".

Different attributions of who the artist behind the original design that served as basis for the Roman sculptor who made the Hera Borghese ranges from Alkamenes to Polykleitos.

In 1976 restorations were undertaken and older restorations done on the statue were undone. It has been suggested that instead of representing the goddess Hera/Juno it instead depicts Aphrodite or Venus- and could be a copy of Aphrodite Euploia by Polykleitos. Comparison with how the figures chiton is draped could also be compared with Venus Genetrix further strengthening the claim.

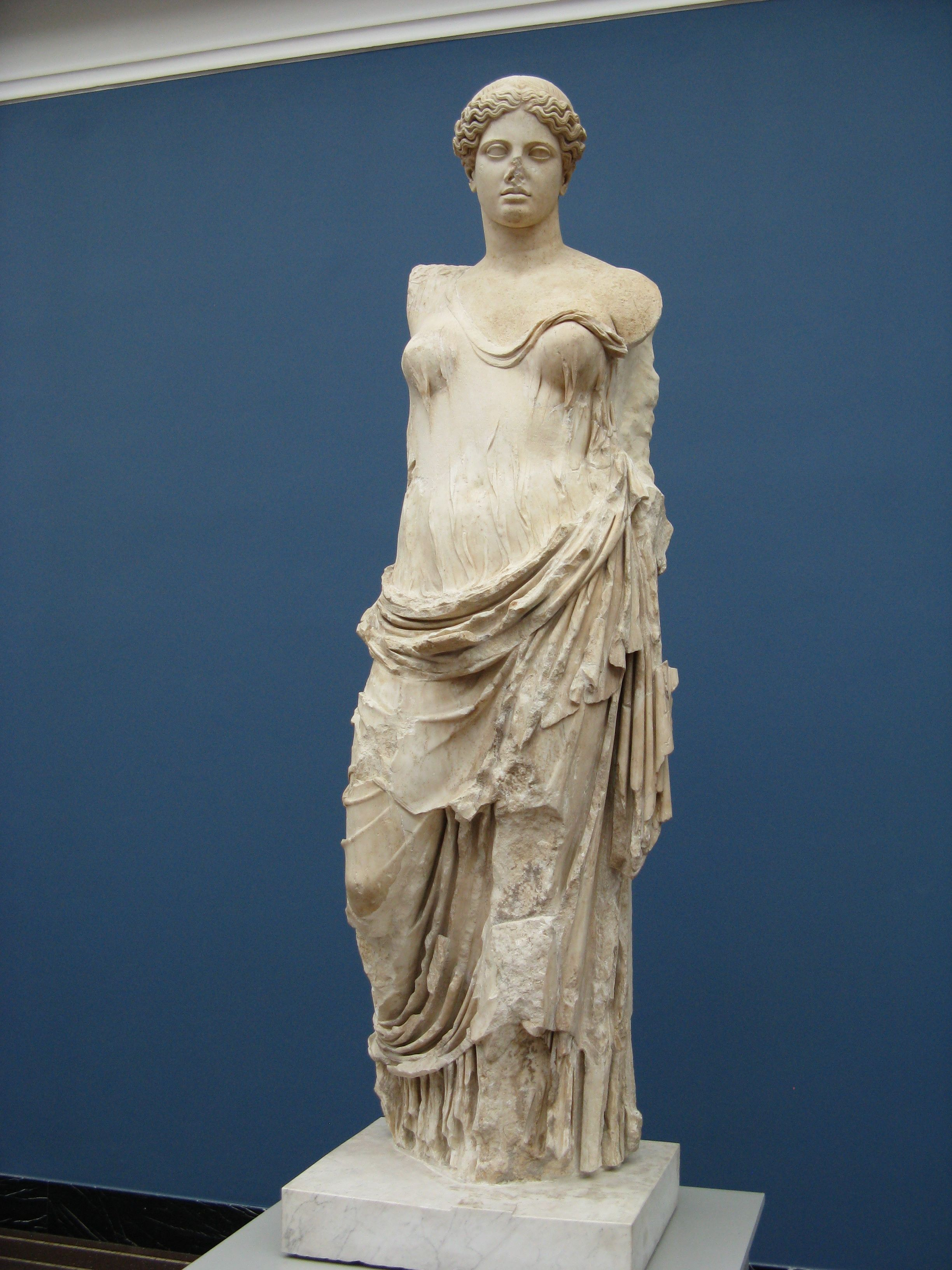
