= Daedala =

Festival in Ancient Greece

In Ancient Greece, the Daedala (Greek: δαίδαλα) was a festival of reconciliation that was held every few years in honor of Hera, consort of the supreme god Zeus at Plataea, in Boeotia, being one of the major cults of the city.

According to Pausanias, there was a "lesser Daedala" (Δαίδαλα μικρά), celebrated every four years or so exclusively by the Plataeans, and a "greater Daedala" (Δαίδαλα μεγάλα), celebrated by all of Boeotians every fourteen cycles (approx. 60 years).

In the lesser Daedala, the people of Plataea went to an ancient oak grove and exposed pieces of cooked meat to ravens, attentively watching upon which tree any of the birds, after taking a piece of meat, would settle. Out of this tree they carved an image, and having it dressed as a bride, they set it on a bullock cart with a bridesmaid beside it. The image seems then to have been drawn to the bank of the river Asopus and back to the town, attended by a cheering crowd.

These adorned xoana were also called "daidala" (δάιδαλα or δαιδάλεια), with the connotation that they were "crafted" or "fashioned" (compare Daedalus, "daidalos" (δαίδαλος) meaning "cunning worker").

After fourteen of these cycles, the great Daidala was celebrated by all the people of Boeotia; and at its start one wooden figure was chosen from the many that had accumulated through the years and designated the "bride". The wooden figure was prepared as a bride for a wedding, ritually bathed in the Asopus, adorned and raised on a wagon with an attendant. This wagon led a procession of wains carrying the accumulated daedala up to the summit of Mount Cithaeron, where a wooden sacrificial altar was erected out of square pieces of wood. This was covered with a quantity of dry wood, and the towns, persons of rank, and other wealthy individuals, offered each a heifer to Hera and a bull to Zeus with plenty of wine and incense, while at the same time all of the daedala were placed upon the altar. For those who did not possess sufficient means, it was customary to offer small sheep, but all these offerings were immolated in a hecatomb in the same manner as those of the wealthier persons. The fire consumed both offerings and altar.

This archaic custom was explained with an aition or "origin myth" about Hera and Zeus, which is related by Pausanias:

Hera, they say, was for some reason or other angry with Zeus, and had retreated to Euboia. Zeus, failing to make her change her mind, visited Kithairon, at that time despot in Plataea, who surpassed all men for his cleverness. So he ordered Zeus to make an image of wood, and to carry it, wrapped up, in a bullock wagon, and to say that he was celebrating his marriage with Plataia, the daughter of Asopus. So Zeus followed the advice of Kithairon. Hera heard the news at once, and at once appeared on the scene. But when she came near the wagon and tore away the dress from the image, she was pleased at the deceit, on finding it a wooden image and not a bride, and was reconciled to Zeus. To commemorate this reconciliation they celebrate a festival called Daidala, because the men of old time gave the name of daidala to wooden images... the Plataeans hold the festival of the Daidala every six years, according to the local guide, but really at a shorter interval. I wanted very much to calculate exactly the interval between one Daedala and the next, but I was unable to do so. In this way they celebrate the feast.

—Pausanias (IX.3 § 1, &c.)

The account of the origin of the Daedala given by Pausanias agrees in the main points with the story related by Plutarch, who wrote a work on the plataean Daedala; the only difference is that Plutarch represents Zeus as receiving his advice to deceive Hera from Alalcomenes (instead of Kithairon), and that he calls Plataea, "Daedala".

== Other usages ==
The term "daedala" can also be taken as a noun derived from Daedalus, the famed inventor. In this sense, Lucretius speaks of Natura daedala rerum, "Nature, the inventor of all things".
