= Theometor =

Epithet

Theometor (Ancient Greek: Θεομήτωρ), meaning 'mother of a god', is an epithet. In the classical world, it was applied to the goddess Hera at Samos, and to Agrippina the Younger on coins (because she was the mother of Nero). In Christian literature, it is an epithet of Mary, mother of Jesus, especially in Eastern Christianity.

== See also ==
- Theotokos
