= Hera =

Goddess from Greek mythology, wife and sister of Zeus

- Queen of the gods; Goddess of marriage, women, marital harmony, and the protector of women during childbirth
- Member of the twelve Olympians
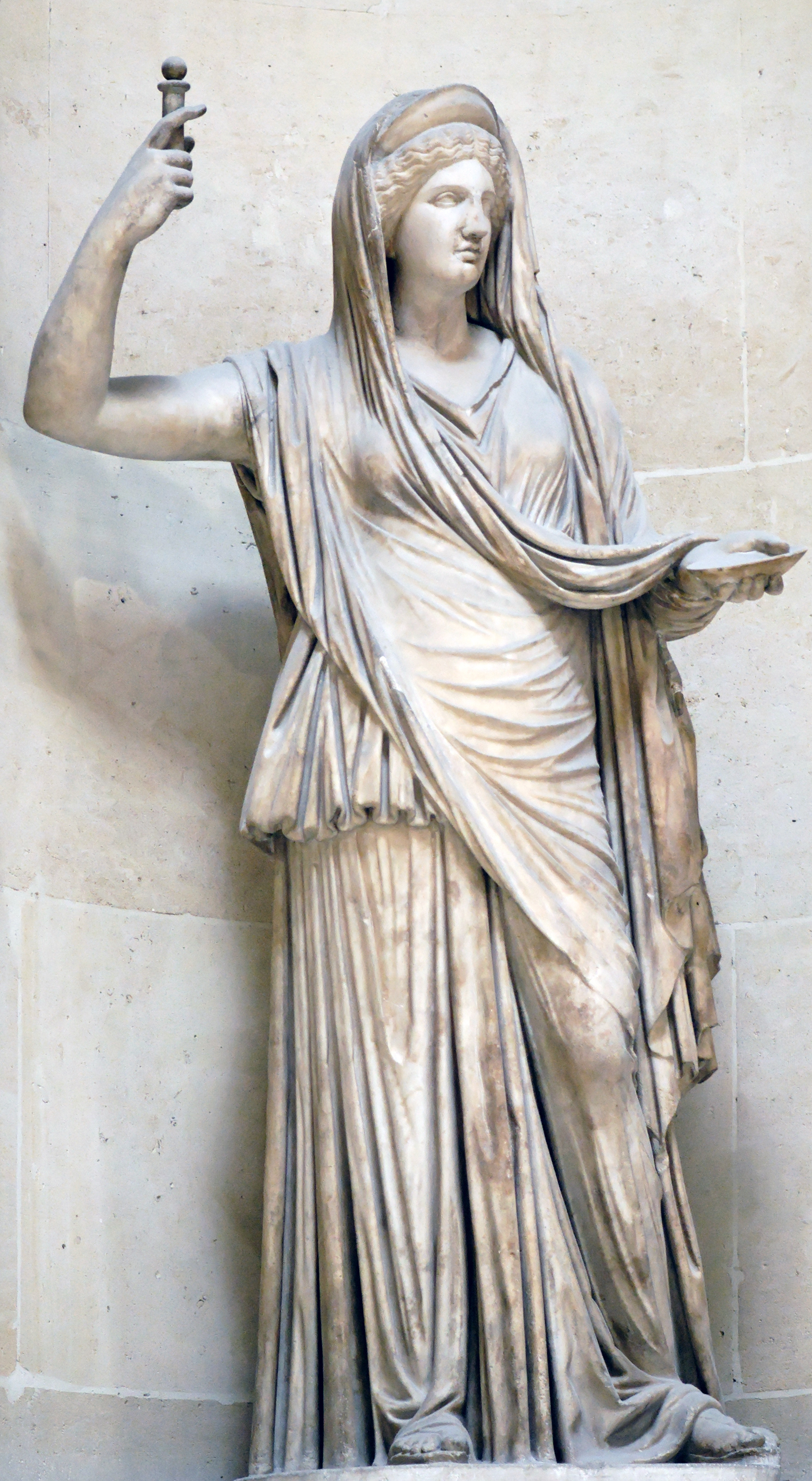
- The Campana Hera, a Roman copy of a Hellenistic original, from the Louvre
- Major cult center: Argos, Mycenae, Samos
- Abode: Mount Olympus
- Animals: Cow, cuckoo, peacock
- Symbol: Pomegranate, sceptre, crown (polos or diadem)

Genealogy
- Parents: Cronus and Rhea
- Siblings: Poseidon, Hades, Demeter, Hestia, Zeus
- Spouse: Zeus
- Children: Angelos, Arge, Ares, the Charites, Eileithyia, Eleutheria, Hebe, Hephaestus

Equivalents
- Roman: Juno

In ancient Greek religion, Hera (/ˈhɛrə, ˈhɪərə/; Ancient Greek: Ἥρα, romanized: Hḗrā; Ἥρη, Hḗrē in Ionic and Homeric Greek) is the goddess of marriage, women, and family, and the protector of women during childbirth. In Greek mythology, she is queen among the twelve Olympians on Mount Olympus, sister and wife of Zeus, and daughter of the Titans Cronus and Rhea. One of her defining characteristics in myth is her jealous and vengeful nature in dealing with any who offended her, especially Zeus's numerous adulterous lovers and illegitimate offspring.

Her iconography usually presents her as a dignified, matronly figure, upright or enthroned, crowned with a polos or diadem, sometimes veiled as a married woman. She is the patron goddess of lawful marriage. She presides over weddings, blesses and legalises marital unions, and protects women from harm during childbirth. Her sacred animals include the cow, cuckoo, and peacock. She is sometimes shown holding a pomegranate as an emblem of immortality. Her Roman counterpart is Juno.

== Etymology ==
The name Hera (Hḗrā or Hḗrē) is attested in Mycenaean Greek, written in Linear B syllabary as 𐀁𐀨 e-ra, appearing on tablets found in Pylos and Thebes; it is attested also in the Cypriotic dialect, in the dative form e-ra-i. It has no clear etymology, and several mutually exclusive etymologies have been preposed.

In a note in his Greek Religion, Walter Burkert records scholars' arguments "for the meaning Mistress as a feminine to Heros, Master", with uncertain origin. John Chadwick, a decipherer of Linear B, remarks, "Her name may be connected with hērōs (ἥρως, 'hero'), but that is no help since it too is etymologically obscure." A. J. van Windekens proposes the meaning "young cow, heifer", which is consonant with Hera's common epithet βοῶπις (boōpis, "cow-eyed"). Alternatively, a Proto-Indo-European root might have meant either "the female who is attached/coupled" or "the female who attaches herself" (whether physically, emotionally, or socially). Robert S. P. Beekes has suggested a Pre-Greek origin.

There are several ancient suggestions no longer considered plausible: One was to connect it with Greek ὥρα (hōra, season), perhaps to be interpreted as "ripe for marriage"; another, put forward by to Plato, was to connect it with ἐρατή (eratē, "beloved"), as Zeus is said to have married her for love. According to Plutarch, Hera was an allegorical name and an anagram of aēr (ἀήρ, "air").

Many theophoric names, such as Heracles, Heraclitus, Herodotus and Herodicus, derive from Hera.

== Epithets ==
Hera bore several epithets in the mythological tradition and in literature. In the historical times the majority of the Greeks recognized Hera as the consort of Zeus. Hera is the protector of marriage and of the rights of the married women. In some cults she has some functions of the earth goddess. She is occasionally related to warfare as tutelary goddess.

=== Goddess of marriage and bride ===
- Γαμήλιος (Gamēlios), 'presiding over marriage'. A sacrifice to Hera ensured a happy married life.
- Γαμηστόλος (Gamēstόlos), 'leading the troop of marriage'.
- Νυμφευομένη (Nympheuomenē), 'led as a bride' at Plataea, in relation to her festival Daedala.
- Νυμφη (Nymphē), 'bride'.
- Παρθένος (Parthénos) 'Virgin'
- Παρθενία (Parthenia),
- Παῖς (Pais) 'Child' (in her role as virgin) at Stymphalus.
- Συζύγιος (Syzygios) 'patroness of marriage'
- Τελεία (Teleia) 'bringing the fulfillement of marriage'.
- Ζυγία (Zygia), 'yoke of marriage'. Her husband Zeus had also the epithet Zygius (Ζυγίος).
- Χήρα (Chḗrα) 'Widowed' at Stymphalus.

=== Consort of Zeus ===
- Ανασσα (Anassa), 'Queen'.
- Ἀμμωνία (Ammonìa), at Elis related to Zeus-Ammon
- Βασίλεια (Basíleia) 'Queen' at Ialysus in Rhodes
- Βασιλίς (Basilis) 'Queen' at Libadia and Argos.
- Διώνη (Diōnē) as the consort of Zeus at Dodona.
- Ολυμπία (Olympia), with an altar near the altar of Olympian Zeus.
- Σκηπτούχος (Skēptouchos),'bearing a sceptre' (Queen).

=== Founder and protector ===
- Αρχηγέτις (Archēgetis), 'founder', leader of the settlement at Samos.
- Ἀκραῖα (Akraìa) '(She) of the Heights (Akropolis)'
- Βουναία (Bounaia) '(She) of the Mound' (in Corinth)
- Ὑπερχειρία (Hypercheiria), 'the goddess who holds her protecting hand over a thing'. Hera was worshipped under this surname at a sanctuary in Sparta, which was built following an oracle's command after the Eurotas River flooded the land.

=== As an earth and fertility goddess ===
- Ἄνθεια (Antheia), meaning flowery at Argos and Miletos.
- Βοῶπις (Boṓpis) 'Cow-Eyed'. probably a form of the earth-goddess.
- Γή (Ge), 'Earth' by Plutarch in a passage of Eusebius.
- Ευεργεσία (Euergesia), 'doing a good service'
- Ζευξιδία (Ζeuxidia),'yoking the oxen' at Argos.
- Πάμφοιτος (Pamfοιtos) 'repeatedly coming'. (Pamfoitos Anassa)
- Φερέσβιος (Pheresbios) 'life giving'. by Empedocles (Plutarch).
- Ωρόλυτος (Hōrolytos) at Samos as the controller of the seasons and times of the year (Horae)

=== As goddess of the hymns ===
- Εὑκέλαδος (Εukelados), 'well sounding, melodious'.
- Προσυμναία (Prosymnaia), 'goddess of the hymn' at Argos.

=== Place of worship ===
- Ἀργείη (Argeìē) '(She) of Argos'. Hera was probably the goddess of the palace.
- 'Ιμβραση (Imbrasē) after the river Imbrasus at Samos.
- Κανδαρηνή (Kandarēnē) at the city Kandara of Asia-Minor.
- Κιθαιρωνία (Κithairōnia) 'of the mountain Kithairon' in Boeotia, in relation with her fest Daedala.
- Λιμανία (Limanìa) ' of the harbour' at Perachora near the Isthmus of Corinth.
- Πελασγίς (Pelasgis) at Iolcus. A sacrifice was performed to Hera by Pelias.
- Σαμία (Samia), with a famous temple at Samos.
- Φαρυγαία (Pharygaia) at the city Pharygae of Locris.

=== Warlike character ===
- Ἀλέξανδρος (Alexandros) 'Protector of Men' (among the Sicyonians). Her cult was founded by Adrastus.
- Ὁπλοσμία (Hoplosmia) 'bearing arms or shield' at Elis, Triphylia, Crotone, Bruttium, and possibly Paestum, Argos, and Samos, where she had a "warlike character."
- Προδρομία (Prodromia), 'running forward' at Sikyon.
- Δρομαία (Dromaia), 'runner' at Thera.
- Πεδίον (Pedion), '[of the racing] field/plain' in Sicily.
- Τροπαία (Tropaia), 'giver of victory' by Lycophron.
- Ἐνυώ (Enyo), 'to accomplish/to kill' by Lycophron.
- Δηίας (Dēías) ‘bringer of destruction’ by Lycophron, according to Tzetzes.
- Ἡνιόχη (Hēniochē) 'Charioteer' at Libadia. Hera-Henioche was worshipped together with "Demeter-Europa,” implying that Hera may have been “the patron goddess of the troop and the Boeotian charioteers.”

=== Local cults ===
- Αἰγοφάγος (Aigophágos) 'Goat-Eater' among the Lacedaemonians
- Εἰλείθυια (Eileithyia) at Argos and Athens as goddess of childbirth. In Theogony Εileithyia is the daughter of Hera.
- Ἐλεία (Eleía) 'of the marsh' at Cyprus.
- Θελξινία (Thelxinìa) at Athens.
- Θεομήτωρ (Theomētōr) 'mother of a god' at Samos.
- Ἱππία (Hippia), 'of the horse' at Olympia.
- Λακίνια (Lacinia) at Croton.
- Λευκώλενος (Leukōlenos) 'White-Armed'
- Μειλίχιος (Meilichios), 'gentle', like "Zeus-Meilichios" at Selinus.
- Μηλιχία (Μēlichia) 'gentle, with gentle words' at Hierapetna.
- Τελχινία (Telchinia): Diodorus Siculus write that she was worshipped by the Ialysians and the Cameirans (both were on the island of Rhodes). She was named thus because according to a legend, Telchines (Τελχῖνες) were the first inhabitants of the island and also the first who created statues of gods.
- Ὑπερχειρία (Ηypercheiria), 'with the hand above' at Sparta.

== Origins ==
In historical times, the majority of the Greeks recognized Hera as the consort of Zeus. Zeus was the protector of rights and mores, and his partner Hera became the protector of legal marriage and the rights of married women. Modern scholars suggest that Hera is not only the Olympian sky-goddess, but in some cults she may be identified as an earth-goddess.

=== Mycenean Greece ===
An inscription in Linear B on a tablet found at Pylos mentions offerings "to Zeus-Hera-Drimios"; Drimios is the son of Zeus. Hera was the tutelary goddess of Argos and it is possible that she had Mycenean origin. Martin P. Nilsson suggested that Hera is mainly the "Argeiē" (Ἀργείη), a name given by Homer which describes her not as Greek, but as an Argive goddess. She is the protectress of the citadel. In literature Argos is called "dōma Hēras" (the house of Hera) and the Argives are called her people by Pindar. Homer's Iliad often uses the formula "boōpis potnia Hērē" (cow-eyed, mistress Hera), which probably relates her to a form of the Mediterranean goddess of nature. The epithet Qo-wi-ja (boōpis) appears in a Linear B inscription. Walter Burkert notices that it is difficult to confirm that the epithet "bowpis" corresponds to a Greek belief. However it is possible that Hera was conceived as a cow in her archaic cults.

=== Consort of Zeus ===
Hera exists as a spouse of Zeus and their "sacred marriage" was celebrated in many Greek festivals in a processional ceremony from ancient times. The myth of the premarital approach of Hera by Zeus is early mentioned by Homer.

Hera moved quickly on to Ida’s peak, high Gargarus. Cloud-gatherer Zeus caught sight of her. As he looked, his wise heart became suffused with sexual desire, as strong as when they’d first made love together, lying on a bed without their parents’ knowledge.

[…]

Then Kronos’ son took his wife in his arms. Underneath them divine Earth made fresh flowers grow—dew-covered clover, crocuses, and hyacinths, lush and soft, to hold the lovers off the ground. They lay together there covered with a cloud, a lovely golden mist, from which fell glistening dew. Then Zeus slumbered peacefully on Mount Gargarus, overcome with love and sleep, his wife in his embrace.

— Homer’s Iliad (Book 14, ln. 295)

It is possible that the myth has its origins in an old custom of the European country population, the premarital intercourse of the engaged couple. According to Walter Burkert the "Mediterranean goddess of nature" becomes the bride of the Greek sky-god. He notices that "the disappearance and retrieval of Hera has parallels with other fertility cults". Hera was originally a goddess of fertility in her "Toneia" festival at Samos and at Knossos in Crete. At Samos the image of Hera was hidden bounted in willows and the participants tried to discover it. At Knossos, Zeus is mating with the earth goddess (finally named Hera) in a very ancient ritual. In her festival Daedala at Plataia there is an account of Hera's quarrel with Zeus and their reconciliation.

=== Near-Eastern origin ===
In Crete the bull was associated with religious practices. In the legend of the Minotaur the Queen of Knossos is hidden inside an artificial hollow cow and she is mating with a bull-form god in a sacred ceremony. The hieros gamos indicates a ritual of fertility magic, which was probably introduced from Near East in the Aegean region. The "hieros gamos" of Zeus with the earth goddess (finally named Hera) was celebrated at Knossos in Crete. In the Near East the solar-deity and the moon-goddess are often represented as a bull and a cow and Roscher proposed that Hera was a moon-goddess. The combination feminine divinity-cow-moon is not unusual in Crete and the Near East. The relationship of Hera with the cow still existed in the historical times and this probably relates her to Near-Eastern forms of cow-goddesses like the Egyptian Hathor (or Bat).

=== Indo-European origin ===
In the Vedic tradition the earth-goddess Prithvi is the consort of the sky-god Dyaus and she is associated with the cow. Prithvi may be identified with the Greek goddess Gaia. Pherecydes of Syros in his cosmogony describes the mating of two divine principles: The marriage of Zas with Chthonie. Geoffrey Kirk notices that after the marriage "Cthonie" becomes Gaia who probably takes charge of the protection of marriage. Hera is occasionally identified with Gaia. In a fragment of Euripides the Aether of Zeus is the sky-god who is the father of men and gods, and the earth-goddess Ge is the mother of all life. It seems that Io, the priestess of Hera at Argos and consort of Zeus, was another form of Hera. In a Greek myth "Io" is transformed into a cow. This seems to be correlated to how Homer in the Iliad makes use of the formula "boōpis potnia Hērē" (cow-eyed, mistress Hera), suggesting that they may have been syncretized.

== Cult ==
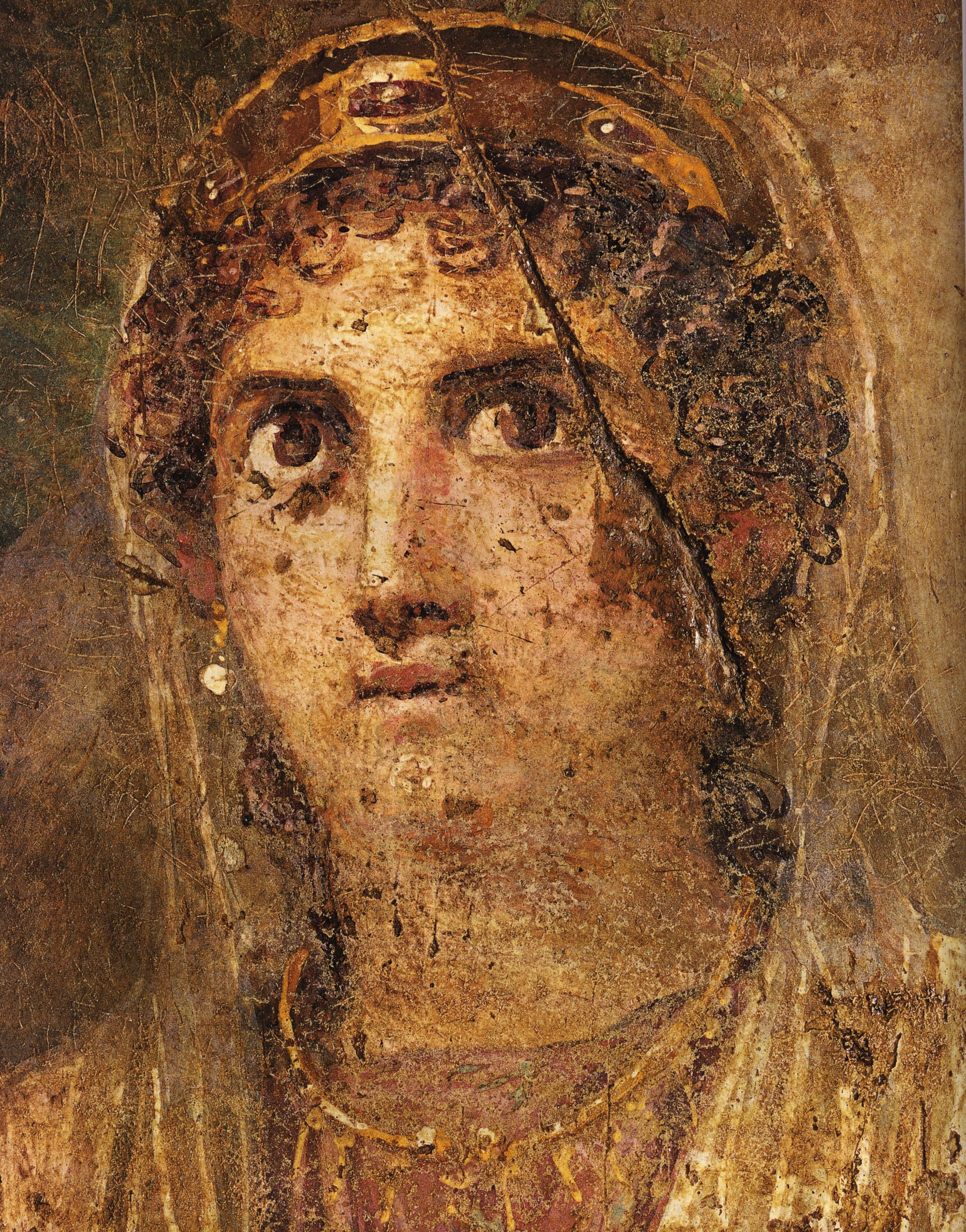
Hera on an antique fresco from Pompeii

The worship of Hera was sparse in Thessaly, Attica, Phocis and Achaea. In Boeotia she is related to the Daedala festival. The main center of her cult was the northeastern Peloponnese, especially the Argolis region. (Argos, Tiryns, Corinth, Sicyon, Epidaurus and Hermione). She was worshipped at the Arcadian cities Mantineia, Megalopolis, Stymphalus and at Sparta. The oldest temple at Olympia belonged to Hera. In the islands she was worshipped at Samos, Paros, Delos, Amorgos, Thera, Kos, Rhodes and Crete. The island Euboea was considered her holy place. A month was named after Hera at Delphi (Heraios), Olous, Laconia, Tinos (Heraiōn), Pergamos (Heraos). Hera is the Olympia, Queen (Anassa), the Queen of heaven. The royal quality of her was preserved by the monuments of Greek art.

Hera may have been the first deity to whom the Greeks dedicated an enclosed roofed temple sanctuary, at Samos about 800 BCE. It was replaced later by the Heraion of Samos, one of the largest of all Greek temples (altars were in front of the temples under the open sky). There were many temples built on this site, so the evidence is somewhat confusing, and archaeological dates are uncertain.

The temple created by the Rhoecus sculptors and architects was destroyed between 570 and 560 BCE. This was replaced by the Polycratean temple of 540–530 BCE. In one of these temples, a forest of 155 columns is visible. There is also no evidence of tiles on this temple, suggesting either the temple was never finished or that the temple was open to the sky.

Earlier sanctuaries, whose dedication to Hera is less certain, were of the Mycenaean type called "house sanctuaries". Samos excavations have revealed votive offerings, many of them dated to the late 8th and 7th centuries BCE, which show that Hera at Samos was not merely a local Greek goddess of the Aegean. The museum there contains figures of gods and suppliants and other votive offerings from Armenia, Babylon, Iran, Assyria, and Egypt, testimony to the reputation which this sanctuary of Hera enjoyed, and the large influx of pilgrims. Compared to this mighty goddess, who also possessed the earliest temple at Olympia and two of the great fifth and sixth-century temples of Paestum, the termagant of Homer and the myths is an "almost... comic figure," according to Burkert.

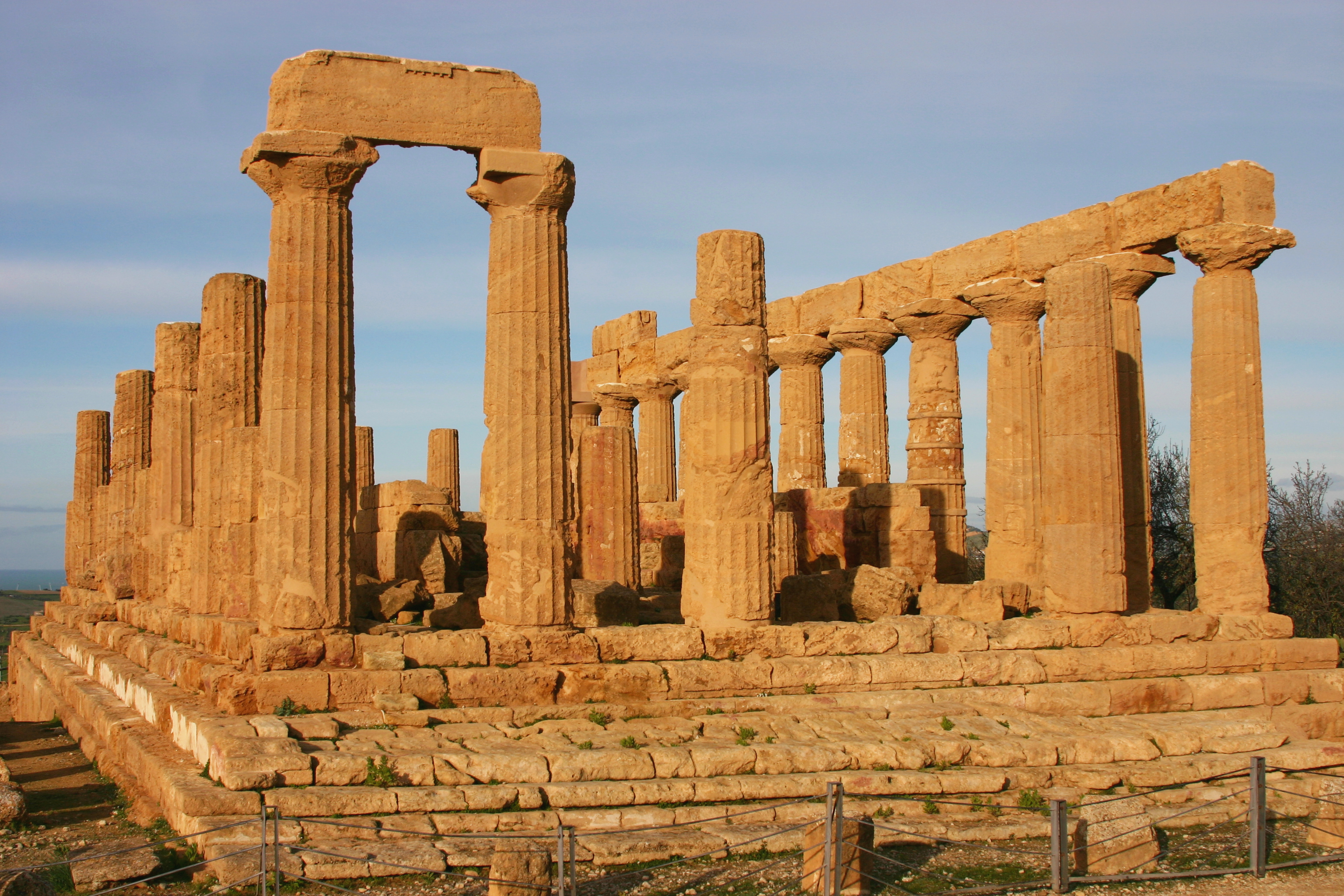
The Temple of Hera at Agrigento, Magna Graecia.

Though the greatest and earliest free-standing temple to Hera was the Heraion of Samos, in the Greek mainland Hera was especially worshipped as "Argive Hera" (Hera Argeia) at her sanctuary that stood between the former Mycenaean city-states of Argos and Mycenae, where the festivals in her honor called Heraia were celebrated. "The three cities I love best," she declares in the Iliad (Book 4), "are Argos, Sparta and Mycenae of the broad streets." There were also temples to Hera in Olympia, Corinth, Tiryns, Perachora and the sacred island of Delos. In Magna Graecia, two Doric temples to Hera were constructed at Paestum, about 550 BCE and about 450 BCE. One of them, long called the Temple of Poseidon, was identified in the 1950s as a temple of Hera.

The Daedala fire festival on Cithaeron near Plataea, included an account of Hera's quarrel with Zeus and their reconciliation.

Hera's importance in the early Archaic Period is attested by the large building projects undertaken in her honor. The temples of Hera in the two main centers of her cult, the Heraion of Samos and the Heraion of Argos in the Argolis, were the very earliest monumental Greek temples constructed, in the 8th century BCE. At Argos the Dorian "Heraion" was built on the hill of Prosymna near Mycenean hero-tombs. At Samos the cult activity near the altar begun in late Mycenean period and a big altar was built in the 9th century BC.

During the Hellenistic Period (c. 323 – 30 BC), Greek culture spread outside Greece across the Eastern Mediterranean region as a result of the conquests of Alexander the Great. The Hellenistic religion was often syncretic, and the Greek gods were identified with local deities as different aspects or names of the same divinity. Hera was identified with various local mother deities. As an example, the work On the Syrian Goddess suggests a cult worshipped a goddess that was simultaneously the Syrian goddess Atargatis and Hera. This even extended to early Christianity some; the Legend of Aphroditian identifies Hera with the Virgin Mary, perhaps due to one of Hera's abilities being her miraculous restoration of her own virginity.

=== Importance ===
According to Walter Burkert, both Hera and Demeter have many characteristic attributes of Pre-Greek Great Goddesses.

In the same vein, British scholar Charles Francis Keary suggests that Hera had some sort of "Earth Goddess" worship in ancient times, connected to her possible origin as a Pelasgian goddess (as mentioned by Herodotus). In Greece the Mediterranean goddess of nature is the bride of the Greek sky-god. In her fest Daedala Hera is related to the nymph Plataia (consort of Zeus), an old forgotten form of the Greek earth-goddess. Plataia may be related to Gaia who is occasionally identified with Hera.

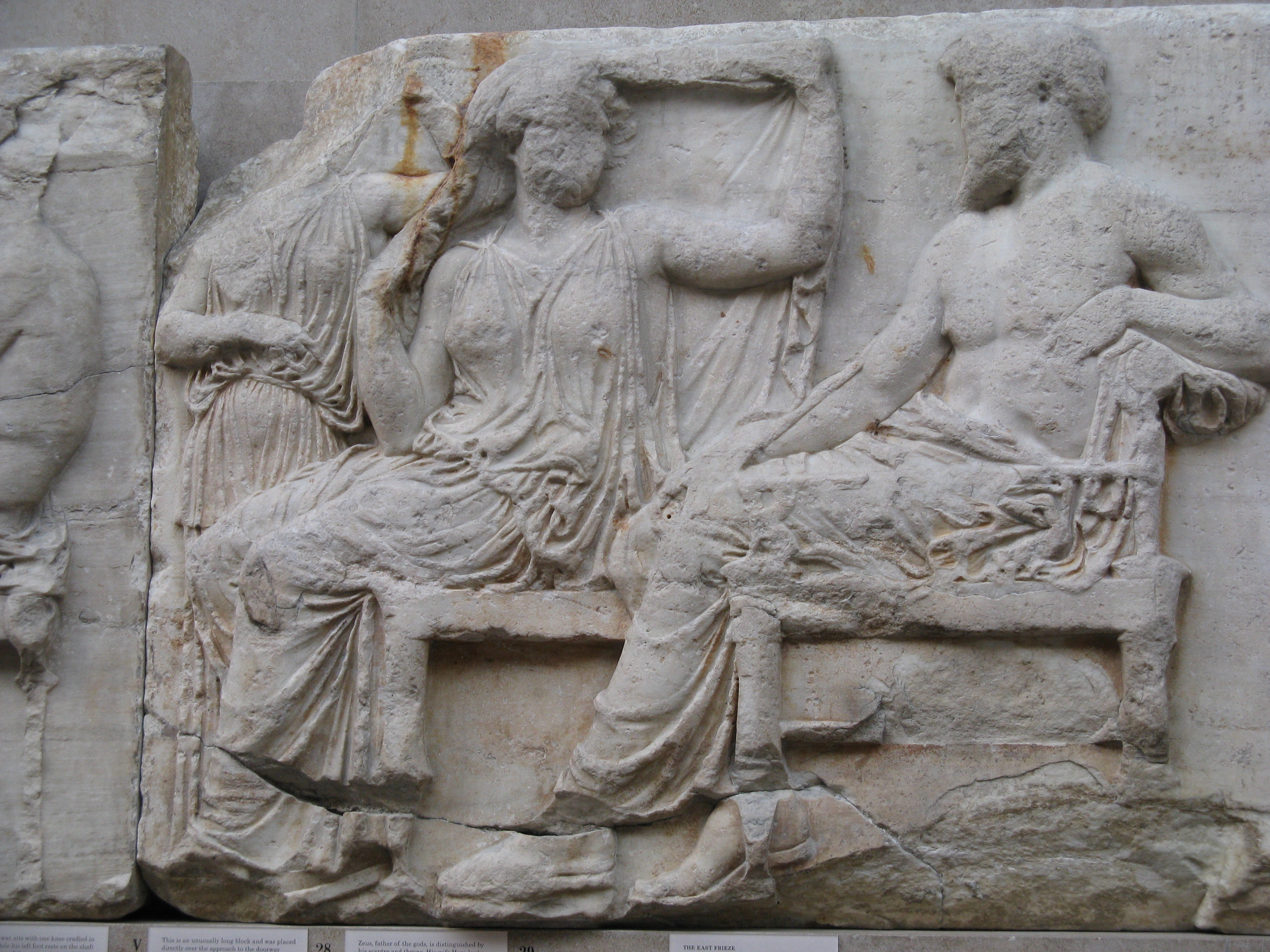
Iris (on the left) with Zeus and Hera, east frieze of the Parthenon, British Museum.

According to Homeric Hymn II to Apollo, Hera detained Eileithyia to prevent Leto from going into labor with Artemis and Apollo, since the father was Zeus. The other goddesses present at the birthing on Delos sent Iris to bring her. As she stepped upon the island, the divine birth began. In the myth of the birth of Heracles, it is Hera herself who sits at the door, delaying the birth of Heracles until her protégé, Eurystheus, had been born first.

Homeric Hymn II to Apollo additionally makes the monster Typhaon the offspring of archaic Hera in her ancient form, produced out of herself, like a monstrous version of Hephaestus, and whelped in a cave in Cilicia. She gave the creature to Python to raise.

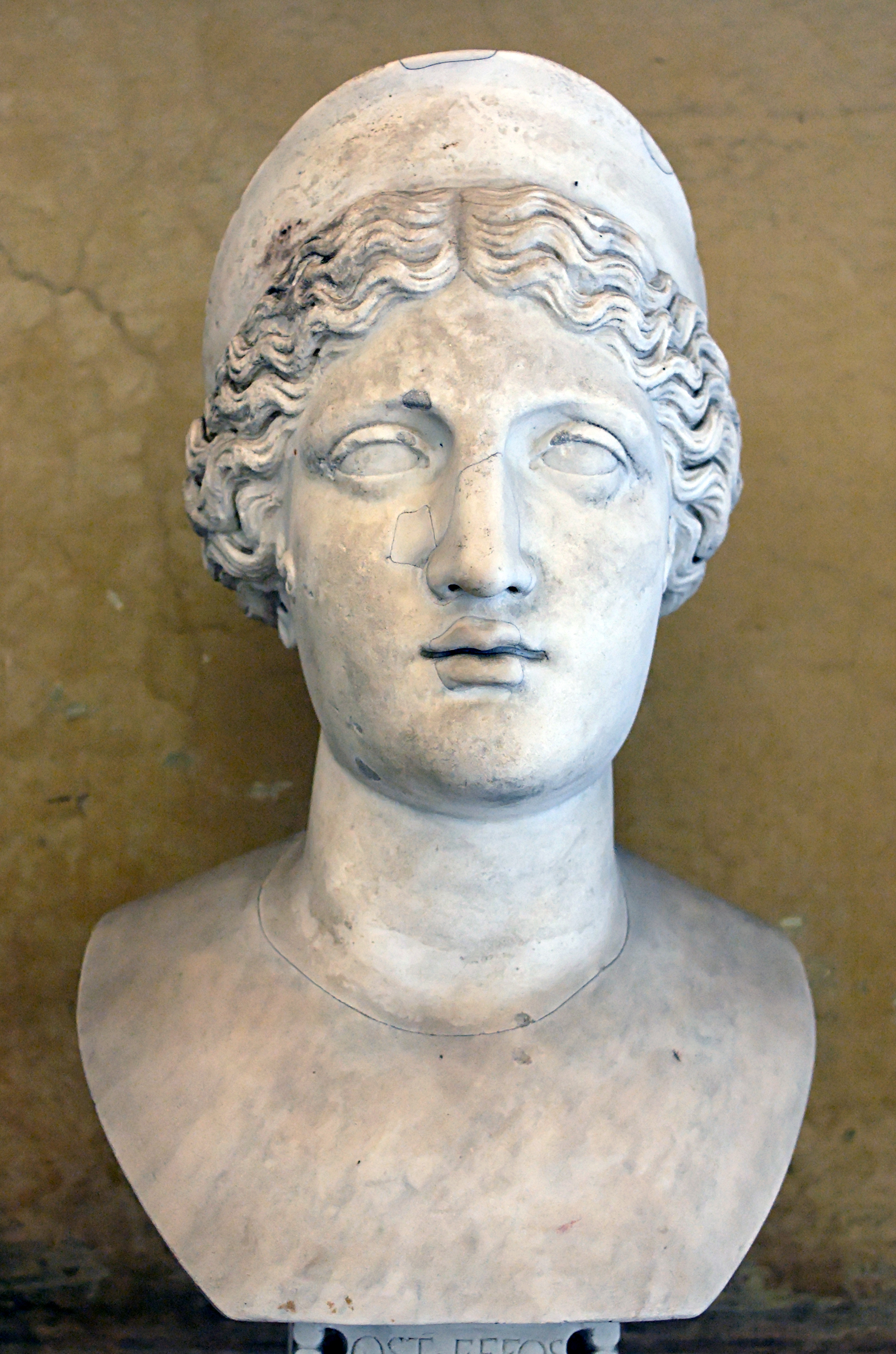
Roman copy of a Greek 5th century Hera of the "Barberini Hera" type, from the Museo Chiaramonti

In the Temple of Hera at Olympia, Hera's seated cult figure was older than the warrior figure of Zeus that accompanied it. Homer expressed her relationship with Zeus delicately in the Iliad, in which she declares to Zeus, "I am Cronus' eldest daughter, and am honourable not on this ground only, but also because I am your wife, and you are king of the gods."

=== Matriarchy ===
There has been considerable scholarship, reaching back to Johann Jakob Bachofen in the mid-nineteenth century, about the possibility that Hera, whose early importance in Greek religion is firmly established, was originally the goddess of a matriarchal people, presumably inhabiting Greece before the Hellenes. In this view, her activity as goddess of marriage established the patriarchal bond of her own subordination: her resistance to the conquests of Zeus is rendered as Hera's "jealousy", the main theme of literary anecdotes that undercut her ancient cult.

However, it remains a controversial claim that an ancient matriarchy or a cultural focus on a monotheistic Great Goddess existed among the ancient Greeks or elsewhere. The claim is generally rejected by modern scholars as insufficiently evidenced. Walter Burkert notices that the ancient Kourotrophos figure is almost absent in Crete, and the nomination Mother Goddess was not the underlying principle in the Minoan religion.

=== Youth ===
Hera was most known as the matron goddess, Hera Teleia, but she presided over weddings as well. In myth and cult, fragmentary references and archaic practices remain of the sacred marriage of Hera and Zeus. At Plataea, there was a sculpture of Hera seated as a bride by Callimachus, as well as the matronly standing Hera.

Hera was also worshipped as a virgin: there was a tradition in Stymphalia in Arcadia that there had been a triple shrine to Hera the Girl (Παις [Pais]), the Adult Woman (Τελεια [Teleia]), and the Separated (Χήρη [Chḗrē] 'Widowed' or 'Divorced'). In the region around Argos, the temple of Hera in Hermione near Argos was to Hera the Virgin. At the spring of Kanathos, close to Nauplia, Hera renewed her virginity annually, in rites that were not to be spoken of (arrheton). In her fire-festival Daedala at Plataia the puppet of the goddess was bathed in the river Asopos before the wedding ceremony. In the festival "Toneia" at Samos the image of the goddess was purified, bounted in willows and then probably hanged on a tree. Robert Graves interprets this as a representation of the new moon (Hebe), full moon (Hera), and old moon (Hecate), respectively personifying the Virgin (Spring), the Mother (Summer), and the destroying Crone (Autumn).

=== Festivals ===
The marriage of Zeus with Hera is the main theme in most Greek festivals celebrated in honour of the goddess. In the cults of Hera the dances and rites are performed by young married women. These choral dances reenacted early myth and ritual. Burkert notices that "the disappearing and retrieval of Hera in some cults has parallels with other fertility cults". The Greek aetiological myths (aitia) give a reasonable explanation of the ritual and replicate its structural form. This is accurate for "aitia" related to initiation rituals from youth to maturity. Ancient accounts refer to the retirement of Hera after a quarrel with Zeus. Hera's wrath may indicate the wrath and jealousy of the Greek wife. Other accounts refer to cultic trees or pillars. and rituals of the goddess of vegetation. Some accounts are related to rituals of the Bronze Age before the splitting of the "Mistress of the animals" into separate goddesses.

- Argos. During Hera's famous festival "Hecatombaia" (one hundred oxen)-or Argive "Heraia"-the priestess of Hera was carried on a chart drawn by white-heifers to the sanctuary. The festival included an armed procession of male citizens and the prize of the contest was a bronze shield. The Argive festival was a new year festival and the new male citizens introduced themselves in the community. It is not verified that the festival was originally a wedding processional ceremony. At Argos Hera controlled the seasonal goddesses Horae. Near the Heraion of Argos there was the stream "Eleutherion" (water of freedom). The priestess of Hera used it for purifications and the sacrifices were kept secret (aporrheta)
- Plataia in Boeotia. The festival Daedala of Hera was a fire festival. The citizens of Plataia maintained from prehistoric times the processional wedding ceremony. A puppet named Hera was married with Zeus. The puppet was washed in the river Asopos and it was carried on a cow-drawn chart to the top of Kithairon. There the puppet was burned together with other idols. Pausanias in the aetiological myth mentions the retirement of Hera after a quarrel with Zeus and their reconciliation. The nymph Plataia, consort of Zeus is an old form of the Greek earth-goddess and she may be related to Gaia. Plataia means the broad one like the Indic Prthvi.
- Samos.The name of the island was "Parthenia" in the Carian period. In the Samian festival "Toneia", Hera was originally a goddess of fertility. The festival included initiation rites of girls and probably boys from youth to maturity. At the beginning of the festival a xoanon of Hera was carried on a plank to the sea and then back to the coast. This custom reminds the cult of the Hittite-Hurrian god of fertility Telepinu. In the aetiological myth of Menedotus the image of Hera was bathed, bounted in willows and finally hidden (or hanged). The participants tried to find it. Zeus was absent, and the processional wedding ceremony was introduced later.
- Corinth. Hera-Acraea was the protectress of the castle. The Corinthian "Heraia" was a mourning festival. Hera is related to Medea (the wife of Jason) a foreign goddess who was introduced in Greece. In the myth of the Argonauts Hera is the protectress of Jason. The scholiast of Euripides suggests that the cult of Acraea is related to the cult of Adonis. Every year seven boys and seven girls with shorn hair and wearing black garments were dedicated to the goddess. Annual sacrifices were performed for the killed children of Medea.
- Stymphalus in Arcadia. Hera was worshipped as goddess of marriage. Three festivals celebrated the three phases of Hera as "pais" (virgin), "teleia" (fulfilled) and "chera" (widowed). "Pais" may symbolize the arrival of the goddess in spring and "chera" her departure in winter. In the aetiological myth of Pausanias Hera retired after a quarrel with Zeus and then she came back. During her retirement people considered that she was divorced and she was worshipped as "chera".
- Euboea. The island was the holy place of Hera and the goddess was worshipped near Elymnion or on the mountain Dirfi. Coins from Eretria verify that the citizens imitated the wedding of Zeus with Hera.
- Athens. The "sacred marriage" of Zeus with Hera was celebrated in Athens during the month "Gamelion" (late winter).
- Hermione in Argolis. Hera was worshipped as "parthenos" (virgin). In a Greek myth Zeus was transformed into a cuckoo to seduce Hera. There were two temples, one of Zeus on the mountain-Cuckoo and one of Hera on the mountain Pron.
- Olympia. In the festival Heraia young girls competed in a footrace. The race was held every four years and only virgin women were allowed to attend the games. The prize was an olive wreath. Traditionally the custom was established by Hipodameia and choral dances were performed in honour of her. A marriage-ceremony was probably part of the festival. The choral dances and the dressing of "parthenoi" indicate that the festival was an initiation ritual from youth to maturity. The relation of Hera with "parthenoi" (virgins) seems to connect her with the goddess of vegetation.
- Aegina'. Traditionally the festival was introduced from Argos. The image of Hera was carried on a chart drawn by white heifers. The festival included games and sacrifices. There was a contest between young boys for killing a female goat with their spears and they got her as a prize. In the aetiological myth Hera retired to the woods after a quarrel with Zeus and her place was discovered by a female goat. Then she was obliged to return.
- Nauplia in Argolis. Like the bride who took her bride-bath, Hera bathed every year in the spring Kanathos and recovered annually her virginity. This is one of the holy secrets (aporrheta) at the mysteries which they celebrated in honour of Hera.
- Knossos in Crete. The "hieros gamos" of Zeus with the earth goddess (finally named Hera) was celebrated near the river Theren. The ritual continued unchanged from very ancient times. The original name of the Minoan goddess could be Britomartis, Diktynna or "Hellopis". On a Minoan depiction the goddess seems to arrive on a chariot during spring and she disappears in winter.

== Emblems ==
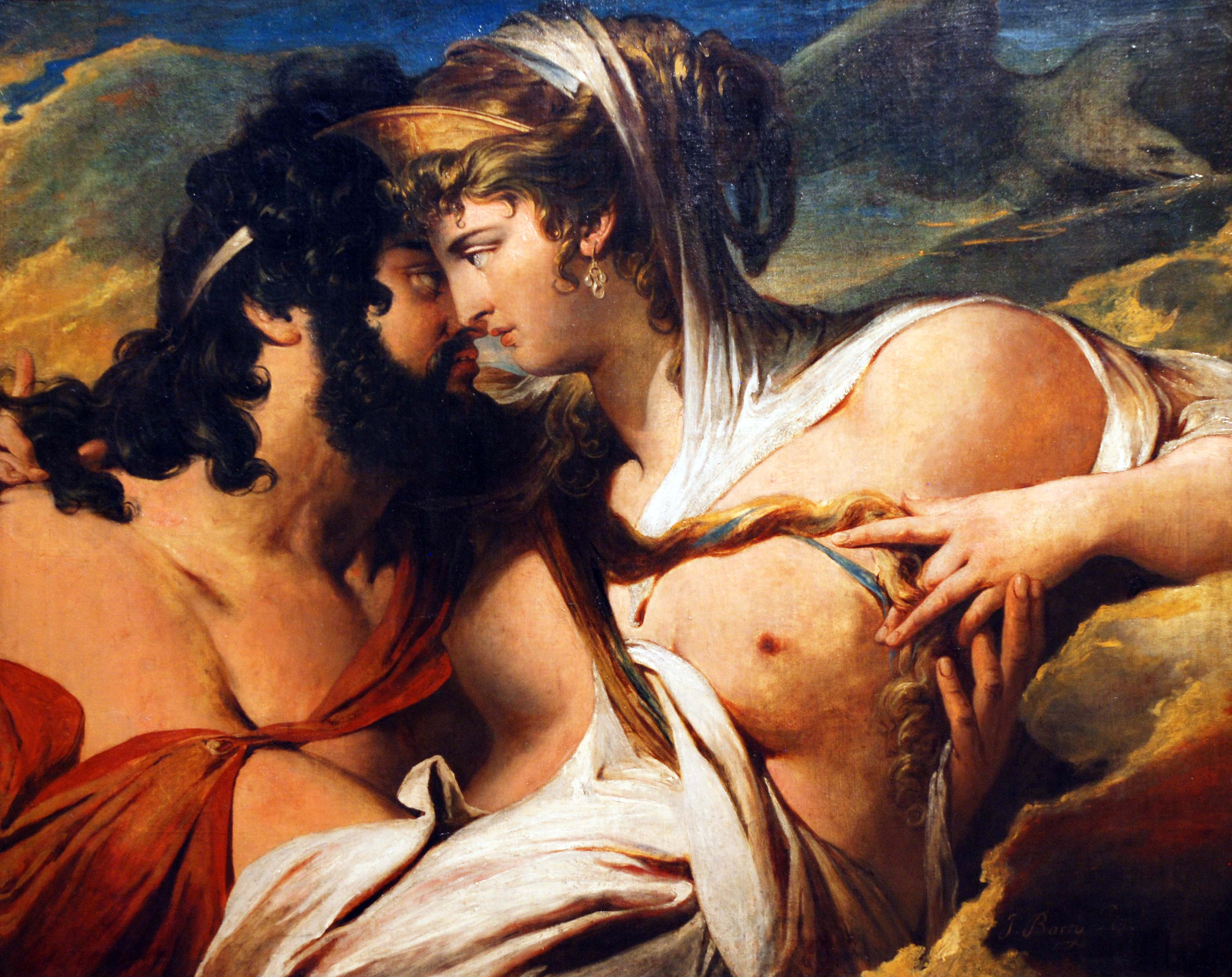
Jupiter and Juno on Mount Ida by James Barry, 1773 (City Art Galleries, Sheffield)

In Hellenistic imagery, Hera's chariot was pulled by peacocks, birds not known to Greeks before Alexander the Great's conquest of the Persian Empire. Alexander's tutor, Aristotle, refers to it as "the Persian bird." The peacock motif was revived in the Renaissance iconography that unified Hera and Juno. A bird that had been associated with Hera on an archaic level, when most of the Aegean goddesses were associated with "their" bird, was the cuckoo, which appears in mythic fragments concerning the first wooing of a virginal Hera by Zeus.

Her archaic association was primarily with cattle, as a Cow Goddess, who was especially venerated in "cattle-rich" Euboea. On Cyprus, very early archaeological sites contain bull skulls that have been adapted for use as masks - see Bull (mythology). Her familiar Homeric epithet Boôpis, is always translated "cow-eyed". In this respect, Hera bears some resemblance to the Ancient Egyptian deity Hathor, a maternal goddess associated with cattle. Hera absorbed the cult of her heifer-priestess Io and may be related to the Vedic earth-goddess Prithvi.

Scholar of Greek mythology Walter Burkert writes in Greek Religion, "Nevertheless, there are memories of an earlier aniconic representation, as a pillar in Argos and as a plank in Samos." At Argos in a Greek myth the priestess of Hera Phoronis ties her mistress to an aniconic pillar. At Samos Hera's plank was tied on a willow tree to ensure fertility.

== Temples of Hera ==
Plan of the Temple of Hera (Olympia):Heraion

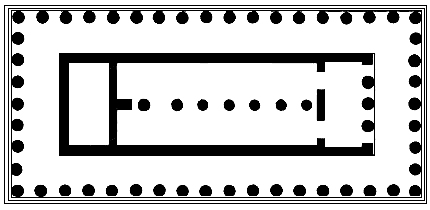
First temple of Hera, Paestum (Basilica)

- Perachora, Corinth. One from the earliest Greek temples was the temple dedicated to Hera Akraia at Perachora, built in the 9th century BC. The dimensions of the plan were 5,50x8,00m. A terracotta house-temple model indicates that it was an upsidal building with one room. The walls were made from small stones and dried bricks. Τhere were two pairs of (probably wooden) columns, and the high-peaked roof was covered with straws.
- Olympia. The Heraion was built in late 7th century BC (620 BC). It was a Doric style peripteral temple measured 18,75x50,01m at the stylobate. The number of the originally wooden pteron columns was 6x16 (hexastyle). Τhe wooden columns were later replaced with columns from limestone. The temple had pronaos, cella, and the oldest known opisthodomos. The porches were distyle in antis. A colossal head of a woman, is probably a part of a statue dedicated to Hera. It was made from limestone.
- Corfu. The Archaic temple of Hera was built in 610 BC. Large terracotta figures such as lions and gorgoneions decorated the roof of the temple. The temple was completely destroyed by fire in the 5th century BC.
- Samos. The older Heraion was built in 560 BC. It was a dipteral temple with Ionic order features. It measured 50,50x103,00 m at the stylobate and the number of pteron columns was 10x21. The temple formed a unit with the monumental altar of Hera to the east, which shared its alignment and axis. It was constructed partly of limestone and partly of marble. Herodotus calls Rhoecus of Samos its first architect. It was the first of the massive Ionic temples.

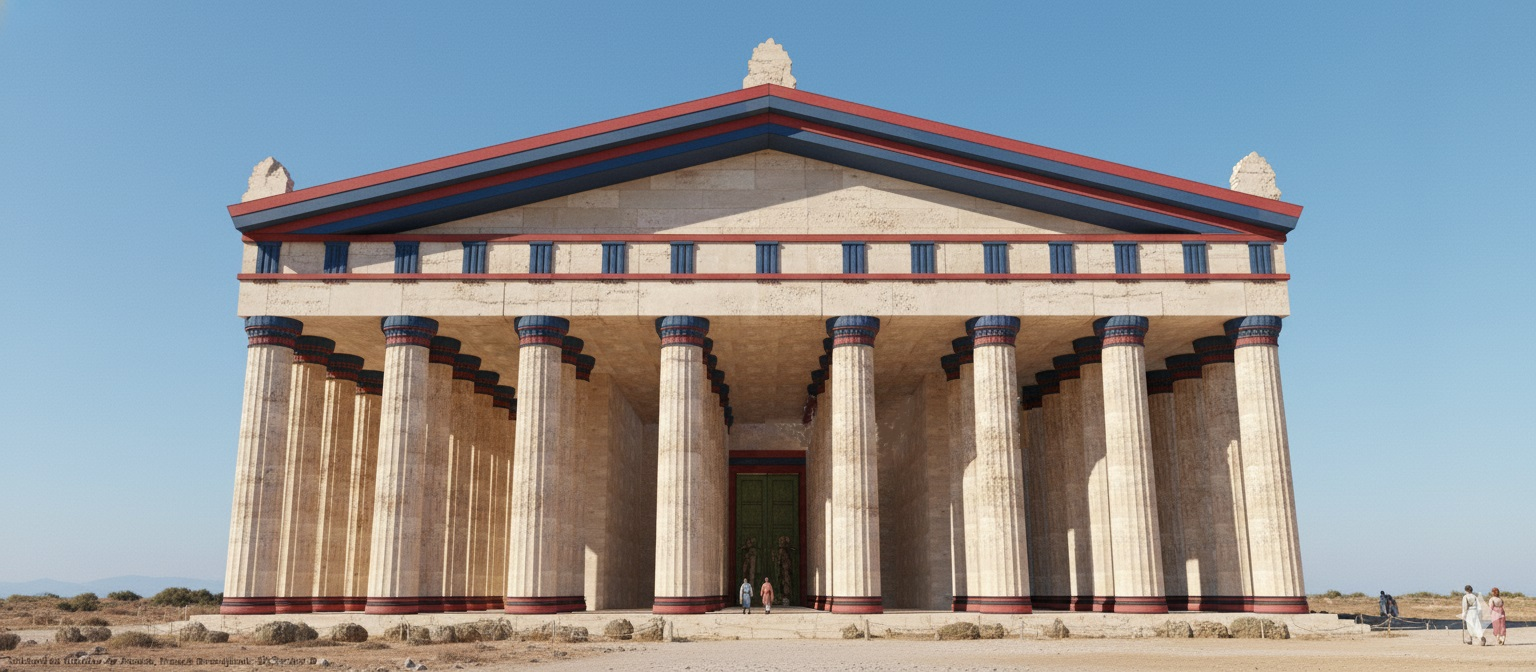
Heraion of Samos. A reconstruction of the "Polycrates temple" (front view)

- Samos. The new Heraion was built in 525 BC and it is called the "Polycrates temple". The temple measured 54,58x111,50m at the stylobate. It was dipteral on the flanks and tripteral at the ends. The outer row had 8x24 columns except that at the back there were nine columns. The forms of the capitals resembled the ones at Ephesus, but the volutes were wider.
- Selinus. The Doric temple E (temple of Hera) was built in 490 BC. It measured 25.32x67.82m at the stylobate and the number of pteron columns was 6x15. The porches were distyle in antis

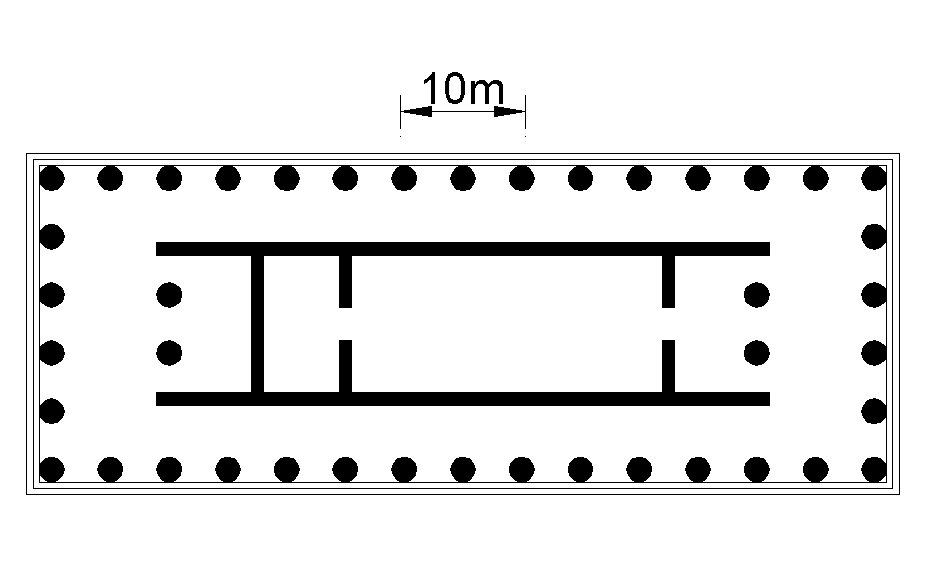
Selinunte Temple E, Temple of Hera

- Paestum. The first temple of Hera, the so-called "Basilica", was built in the early 6th century BC. It was an extraordinary building with a central row of inner columns. The Doric style temple measured 24,52x54,30m at the stylobate, and the number of pteron columns was 9x18. There were three columns in antis in its porch.
- Paestum. A Doric temple dedicated to Hera (the so-called temple of Poseidon) was built in the first half of the 5th century BC and is usually placed later than the Parthenon. The temple measured 24,3X60,00 m at the stylobate. It was an hexastyle structure and the number of pteron columns was 6x14. The temple was also used to worship Zeus and another deity, whose identity is unknown.

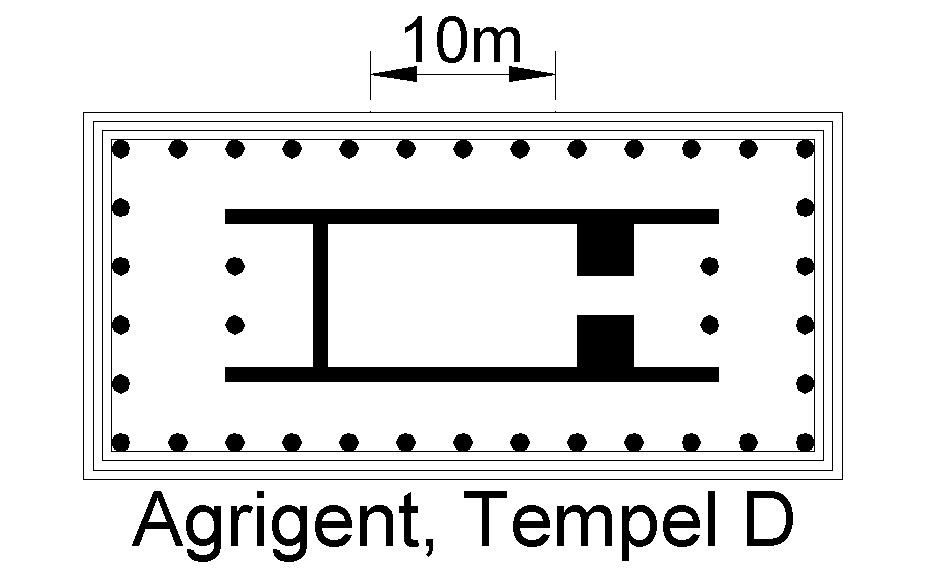
Agrigento-Temple D-of Hera

- Agrigento. The temple of Hera (Juno Lacinia) was a Doric style peripteral building, built in 450 BC. It measured 16,90X38,15m at the stylobate and the cella measured 9.45x28,00m. The number of pteron columns was 6X13.
- Argos. The predecessor of the Heraion was built in the late 7th century BC and has left little traces. The long stoa of the Heraion is dated from the late 7th to 6th century BC.
- Argos. The new Heraion was built in c. 410 BC after the burning of its predecessor in 423 BC. It measured 17,40x38,00m at the stylobate and the dimensions of the cella were c.10,00x c.27,00m. The number of pteron columns cannot be specified.

== Mythology ==
=== Birth ===
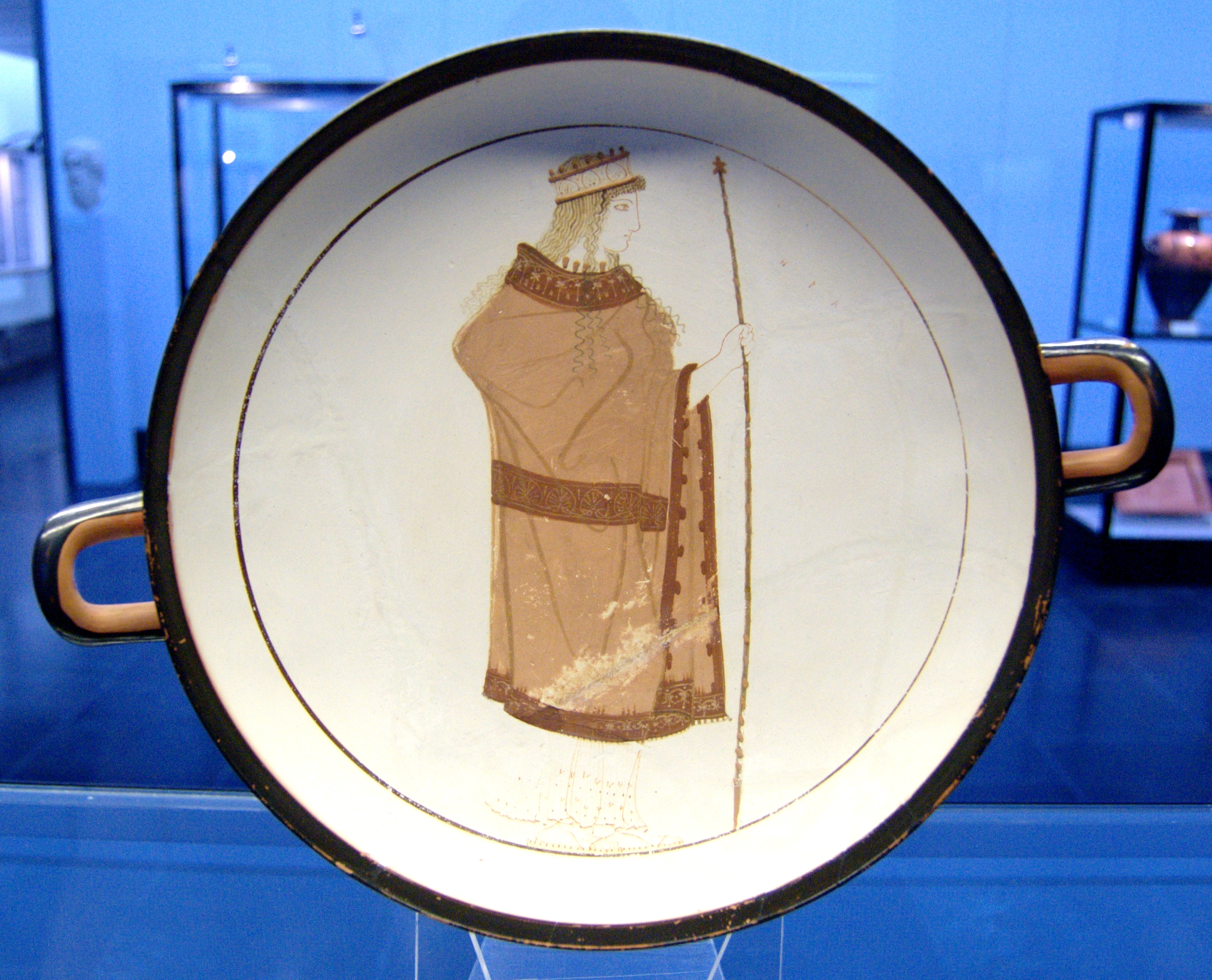
Hera (according to inscription); tondo of an Attic white-ground kylix from Vulci, ca. 470 BCE

Hera is the daughter of the Titans Cronus and Rhea, and the sister of Hestia, Demeter, Hades, Poseidon, and Zeus. Cronus was fated to be overthrown by one of his children; to prevent this, he swallowed all of his newborn children whole until Rhea tricked him into swallowing a stone instead of her youngest child, Zeus. Zeus grew up in secret and then tricked his father into regurgitating his siblings, including Hera. Zeus then led the revolt against the Titans, banished them, and divided the dominion over the world with his brothers, Poseidon and Hades.

Other traditions, however, appear to give Hera different upbringings. Pausanias states that she was nursed as an infant by the three daughters of the river Asterion: Euboia, Prosymna, and Akraia. Furthermore, in the Iliad, Hera states she was given by her mother to Tethys to be raised: "I go now to the ends of the generous earth on a visit to the Ocean, whence the gods have risen, and Tethys our mother who brought me up kindly in their own house, and cared for me and took me from Rheia, at that time when Zeus of the wide brows drove Kronos underneath the earth and the barren water."

=== Marriage with Zeus ===
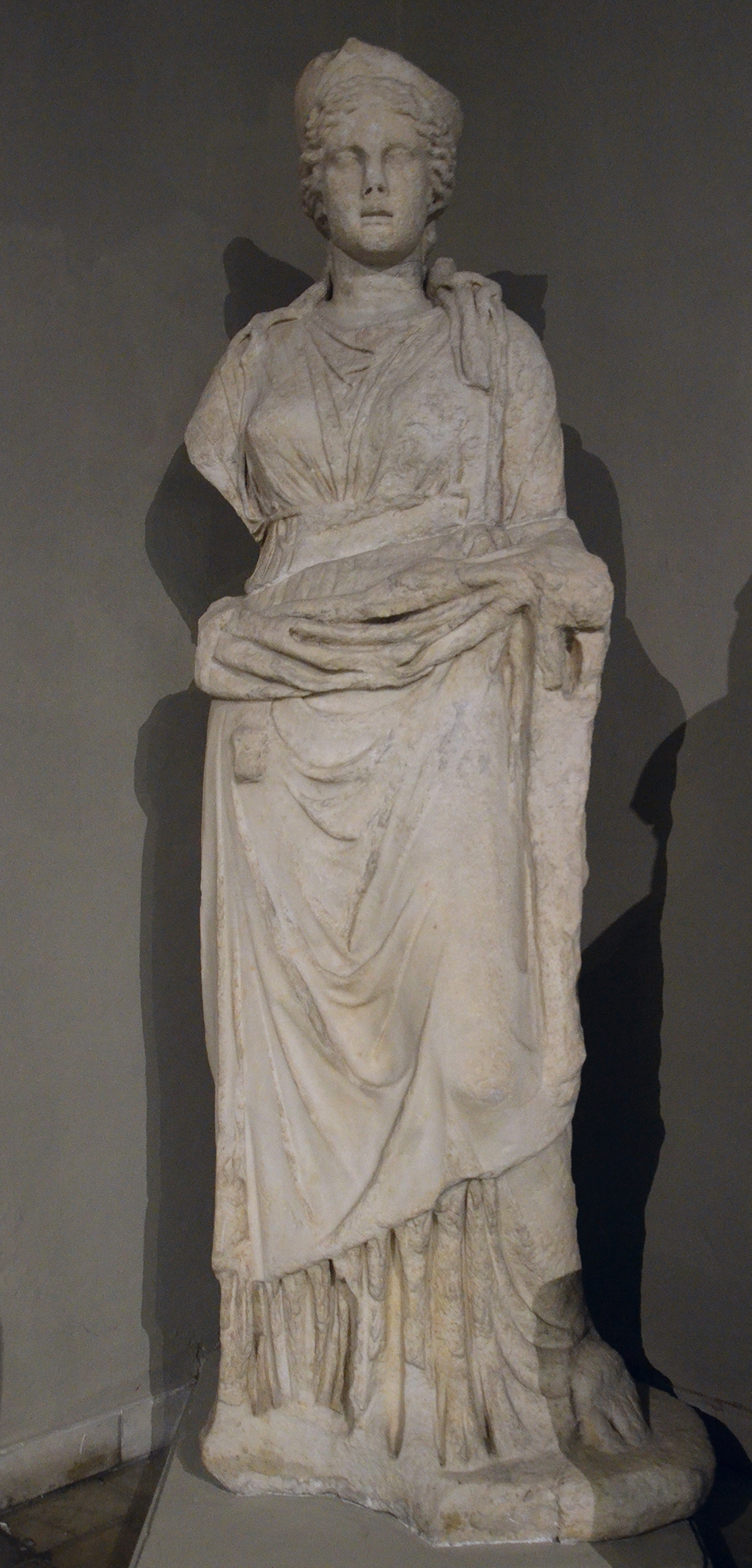
Marble statue of Hera, 2nd century, Cyprus Museum, Nicosia.

Hera is the goddess of marriage and childbirth rather than motherhood, and much of her mythology revolves around her marriage with her brother Zeus. She is charmed by him and she seduces him; he cheats on her and has many children with other goddesses and mortal women; she is intensely jealous and vindictive towards his children and their mothers; he is threatening and violent to her.

In the Iliad, Zeus implies their marriage was some sort of elopement, as they lay secretly from their parents. Pausanias records a tale of how they came to be married in which Zeus transformed into a cuckoo to woo Hera. She caught the bird and kept it as her pet; this is why the cuckoo is seated on her sceptre. According to a scholion on Theocritus's Idylls, when Hera was heading toward Mount Thornax alone, Zeus created a terrible storm and transformed himself into a cuckoo who flew down and sat on her lap. Hera covered him with her cloak. Zeus then transformed back and took hold of her; because she was refusing to have sex with him due to their mother, he promised to marry her.

In one account Hera refused to marry Zeus and hid in a cave to avoid him; an earthborn man named Achilles convinced her to give him a chance, and thus the two had their first sexual intercourse. According to a version attributed to Plutarch, Hera had been reared by a nymph named Macris on the island of Euboea, but Zeus stole her away, where Mt. Cithaeron "afforded them a shady recess." When Macris came to look for her ward, the mountain-god Cithaeron drove her away, saying that Zeus was taking his pleasure there with Leto.

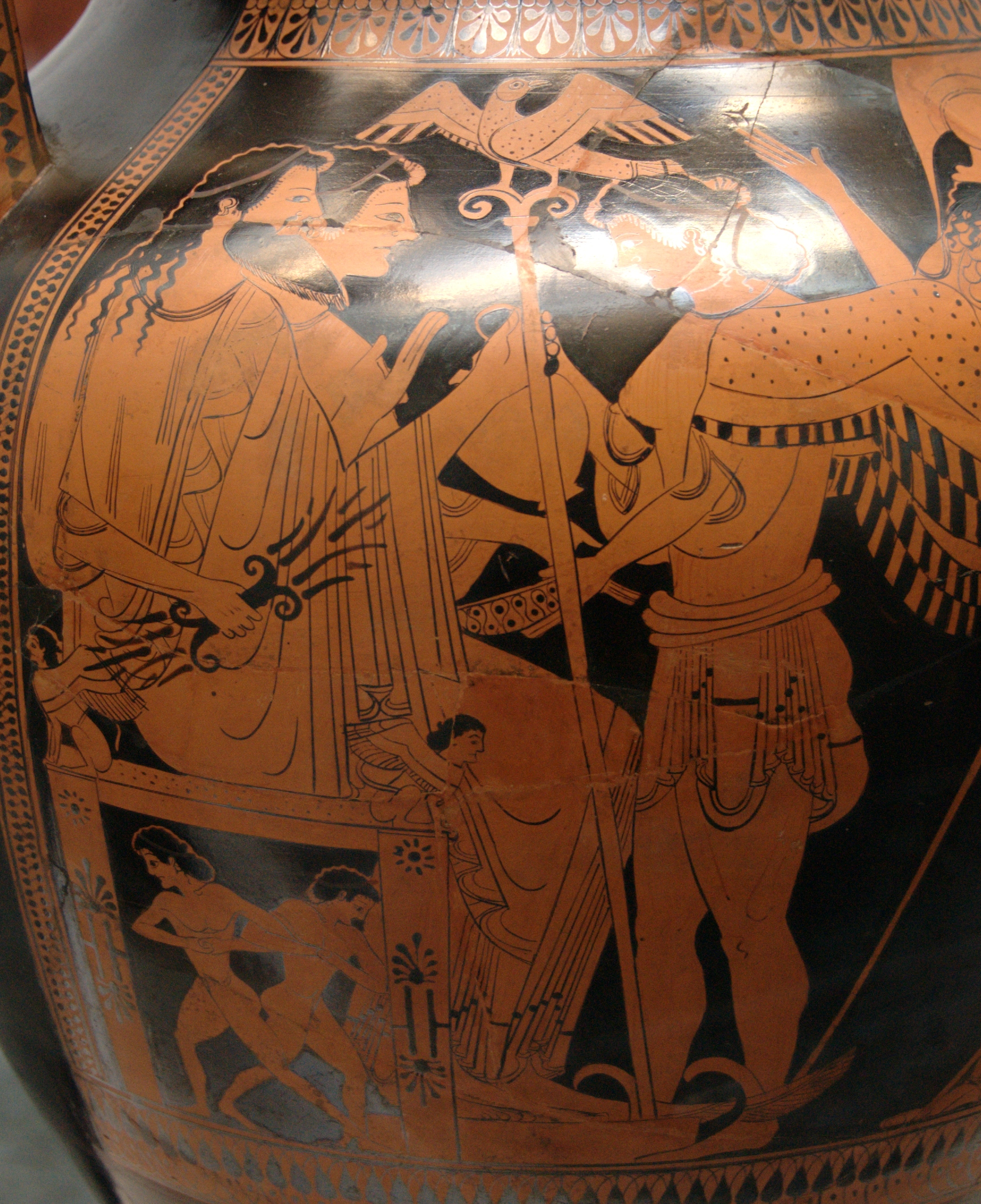
God council in Olympus: Zeus and Hera throning, Iris serving them. Detail of the side A of an Attic red-figure belly-amphora, ca. 500 BC.Staatliche Antikensammlungen, Munich

According to Callimachus, their wedding feast lasted three hundred years. All the gods and mortals were invited, but a nymph named Chelone was disrespectful or refused to attend, so Zeus thus turned her into a tortoise. The Apples of the Hesperides that Heracles was tasked by Eurystheus to take were a wedding gift by Gaia to the couple.

After a quarrel with Zeus, Hera left him and retreated to Euboea, and no word from Zeus managed to sway her mind. Cithaeron, the local king, then advised Zeus to take a wooden statue of a woman, wrap it up, and pretend to marry it. Zeus did as told, claiming "she" was Plataea, Asopus's daughter. Hera, once she heard the news, disrupted the wedding ceremony and tore away the dress from the figure only to discover it was but a lifeless statue, and not a rival in love. The queen and her king were reconciled, and to commemorate this the people there celebrated a festival called Daedala. During the festival, a re-enactment of the myth was celebrated, where a wooden statue of Hera was chosen, bathed in the river Asopus and then raised on a chariot to lead the procession like a bride, and then ritually burned.

According to Diodorus Siculus, Alcmene, the mother of Heracles, was the very last mortal woman Zeus ever had sex with; following the birth of Heracles, he ceased to beget humans altogether.

=== Leto and the Twins: Apollo and Artemis ===
In the early works of Homer and Hesiod, Hera displays no inherent animosity towards Leto or her children (for being children of an affair, that is. She quarrels with them for political reasons in the Iliad). In Hesiod's Theogony, Leto is presented as one of Zeus's wives prior to Hera, giving no indication that Hera disliked them. In later variations of this story, our earliest account being the Homeric Hymn to Delian Apollo, Hera was enraged when she discovered that Leto was pregnant and that Zeus was the father; especially when she was told that Apollo would be more dear to Zeus than Hera's son Ares. Hera received help from Ares and Iris to prevent Leto from giving birth, whence they "threatened all the cities which Leto approached, and prevented them from receiving her." Alternatively, Juno convinced the nature spirits to prevent Latona (Leto) from giving birth on terra-firma, the mainland, any island at sea, or any place under the sun, but Poseidon felt pity to Leto and guided her to the floating island of Delos, which was neither mainland nor a real island where Leto was able to give birth to her children. Afterwards, Zeus secured Delos to the bottom of the ocean. The island later became sacred to Apollo. Alternatively, Hera kidnapped her daughter Eileithyia, the goddess of childbirth, to prevent Leto from going into labor. The other gods bribed Hera with a beautiful necklace nobody could resist and she finally gave in.

Either way, Artemis was born first (earlier sources make no mention of them being twins, so Artemis could be any age older than Apollo) and then assisted with the birth of Apollo. Some versions say Artemis helped her mother give birth to Apollo for nine days. Another variation states that Artemis was born one day before Apollo, on the island of Ortygia and that she helped Leto cross the sea to Delos the next day to give birth to Apollo.

Later, Tityos attempted to rape Leto at the behest of Hera. He was slain by Artemis and Apollo.

This account of the birth of Apollo and Artemis is contradicted by Hesiod in the Theogony, as the twins are born prior to Zeus's marriage to Hera.

=== Semele and Dionysus ===
When Hera learned that Semele, daughter of Cadmus, the founder-king of Thebes, was pregnant by Zeus, she disguised herself as Semele's nurse and persuaded the princess to insist that Zeus show himself to her in his true form. When he was compelled to do so, having sworn by the River Styx, his thunder and lightning destroyed Semele. Zeus took Semele's unborn child, Dionysus, and completed its gestation so the latter was sewn into his own thigh.

In another version, Dionysus was originally the son of Zeus by either Demeter or Persephone. Hera sent her Titans to rip the baby apart, from which he was called Zagreus ("Torn in Pieces"). Zeus rescued the heart; or, the heart was saved, variously, by Athena, Rhea, or Demeter. Zeus used the heart to recreate Dionysus and implant him in the womb of Semele—hence Dionysus became known as "the twice-born". Certain versions imply that Zeus gave Semele the heart to eat to impregnate her. Hera tricked Semele into asking Zeus to reveal his true form, which killed her. Dionysus later managed to rescue his mother from the underworld and have her live on Mount Olympus.

=== Heracles ===
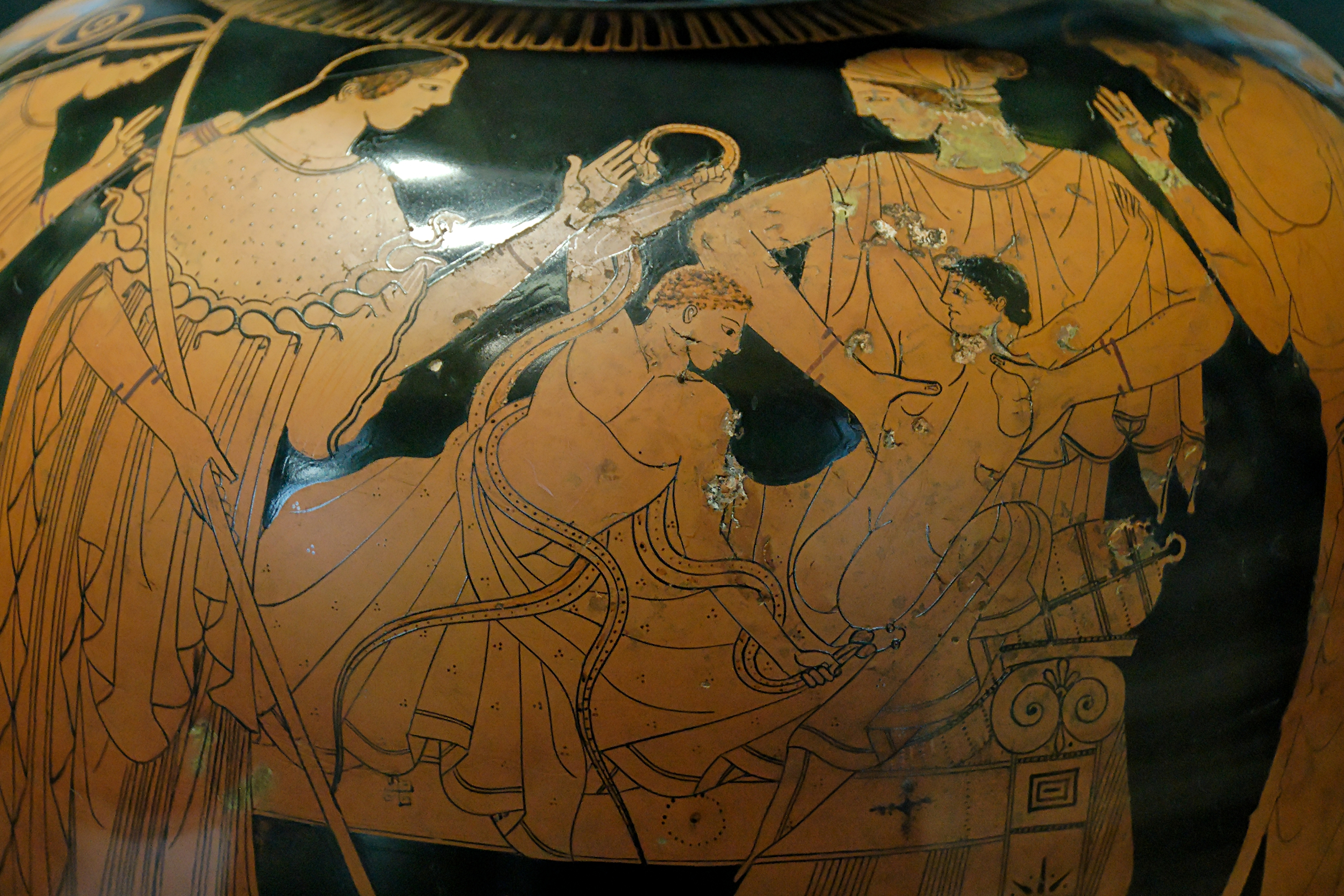
Heracles strangling the snakes sent by Hera, Attic red-figured stamnos, ca. 480–470 BCE. From Vulci, Etruria.

Hera is the stepmother and enemy of Heracles. The name Heracles means "Glory of Hera". In Homer's Iliad, when Alcmene was about to give birth to Heracles, Zeus announced to all the gods that on that day a child by Zeus himself, descended from his son Perseus, would be born and rule all those around him. Hera, after requesting Zeus to swear an oath to that effect, descended from Olympus to Argos and made the wife of Sthenelus (son of Perseus) give birth to Eurystheus after only seven months, while at the same time preventing Alcmene from delivering Heracles. This resulted in the fulfillment of Zeus's oath in that it was Eurystheus rather than Heracles. In Pausanias' recounting, Hera sent witches (as they were called by the Thebans) to hinder Alcmene's delivery of Heracles. The witches were successful in preventing the birth until Historis, daughter of Tiresias, thought of a trick to deceive the witches. Like Galanthis, Historis announced that Alcmene had delivered her child; having been deceived, the witches went away, allowing Alcmene to give birth.

Hera's wrath against Zeus's son continued and while Heracles was still an infant, Hera sent two serpents to kill him as he lay in his cot. Heracles throttled the snakes with his bare hands and was found by his nurse playing with their limp bodies as if they were a child's toys.

According to an earlier source, however, Hera had nothing to do with the snakes in Heracles's crib. Pherecydes said that "it was Amphitryon who put the serpents in the bed, because [then] he would know which of the two children was his, and that when Iphicles fled, and Heracles stood his ground, he knew that Iphicles was begotten of his body."

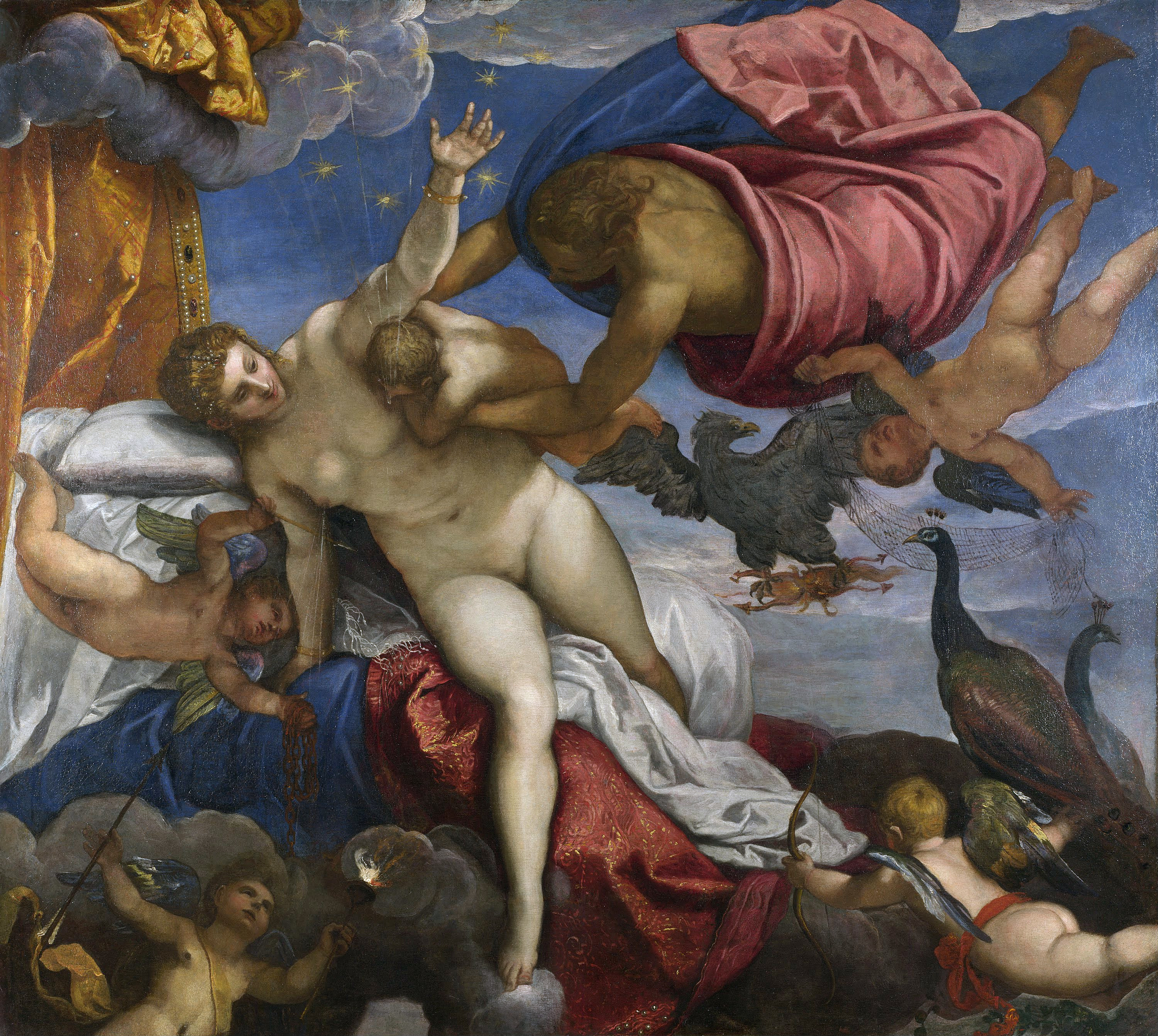
The Origin of the Milky Way by Jacopo Tintoretto, 1575

One account of the origin of the Milky Way is that Zeus had tricked Hera into nursing the infant Heracles: discovering who he was, she pulled him from her breast and a spurt of her milk formed the smear across the sky that can be seen to this day. Her milk also created a white flower, the lily. Unlike the Greeks, the Etruscans instead pictured a full-grown bearded Heracles at Hera's breast, a reference to his adoption by her when he became an immortal: he had previously wounded her severely in the breast.

When Heracles reached adulthood, Hera drove him mad, which led him to murder his family and this later led to him undertaking his famous labours (Alternatively, according to Euripides's Herakles, this happened after his labors had been completed). Hera assigned Heracles to labour for King Eurystheus at Mycenae. She attempted to make almost all of Heracles's twelve labours more difficult. When he fought the Lernaean Hydra, she sent a crab to bite at his feet in the hopes of distracting him. Later Hera stirred up the Amazons against him when he was on one of his quests, claiming that he kidnapped their queen, Hippolyte. When Heracles took the cattle of Geryon, he shot Hera in the right breast with a triple-barbed arrow: the wound was incurable and left her in constant pain, as Dione tells Aphrodite in the Iliad (Book V). Afterwards, Hera sent a gadfly to bite the cattle, irritate them and scatter them. Hera then sent a flood which raised the water level of a river so much that Heracles could not ford the river with the cattle. He piled stones into the river to make the water shallower. When he finally reached the court of Eurystheus, the cattle were sacrificed to Hera.

That was not the only time Heracles had violently attacked Hera, either. After murdering Iphitus of Oechalia in cold blood and seeking purification for the crime from Neleus, king of Pylos, Neleus and his fourteen children turned him away. After being purified elsewhere, "Heracles then marched against Neleus and not only sacked Pylos, but even wounded Hera, who was fighting as Neleus' ally. As for Neleus himself, Heracles killed him and his children, except for the youngest, Nestor."

Eurystheus also wanted to sacrifice the Cretan Bull to Hera. She refused the sacrifice because it reflected glory on Heracles. The bull was released and wandered to Marathon, becoming known as the Marathonian Bull.

Some myths state that in the end, Heracles befriended Hera by saving her from Porphyrion, a giant who tried to rape her during the Gigantomachy, and that she even gave her daughter Hebe as his bride. Whatever myth-making served to account for an archaic representation of Heracles as "Hera's man", it was thought suitable for the builders of the Heraion at Paestum to depict the exploits of Heracles in bas-relief.

Summary table of Hera and Zeus' consorts
Woman	Offspring	Hera's reaction	Notes	Ref.
Aegina	Aeacus	Hera poisoned all the water on the island of Aegina, requiring Zeus to repopulate the island using local ants transformed into people.	Other versions have Aegina being unpopulated in the first place, hence Zeus' intervention.	
Alcmene	Heracles	With Eileithyia's help, Hera delayed Heracles' birth, losing him his birthright and causing great pain to Alcmene. When Heracles was older, she drove him mad so that he killed his family and attempted to sabotage several of his Twelve Labours.		
Antigone	None	Hera transformed Antigone into a stork for sleeping with Zeus.	Most versions cite Antigone's attempt to compete with the goddess in beauty as Hera's motivation.	
Aphrodite	Priapus	Hera cursed Aphrodite's growing belly, so that the infant was born with a permanent and ugly erection.	Priapus' father depends on version.	
Callisto	Arcas	In some versions Hera turned Callisto into a bear, and convinced Artemis to shoot the bear with one of her arrows. Once Callisto became a constellation (Ursa Major) Hera begged Tethys to never let Callisto set below the horizon and into the water, keeping her thirsty perpetually.	Equivalent stories were also said about Themisto and Megisto.	
Elara	Tityos	Zeus hid Elara in the earth to protect her from Hera's revenge.		
Io	Epaphus	Hera transformed Io into a cow, or in the versions where Zeus was the agent of transformation, sent a gadfly to sting and torment Io all over the Mediterranean until she relented. Hera also had the Curetes kidnap Epaphus from Io.		
Lamia	Unnamed children	Hera kidnapped or killed Lamia's children by Zeus, and then transformed her into a child-killing monster.		
Leto	Apollo, Artemis	Hera forbade Leto from giving birth anywhere on earth, causing her to wonder around until Delos defied Hera's orders. Hera then withheld Eileithyia, leaving Leto to suffer the pangs of childbirth for days until Eileithyia arrived and the twins were delivered. Some time later, Hera sent Tityos to attack Leto, but he was slain by the twins.		
Othreis	Meliteus	Othreis exposed her son Meliteus once he was born out of fear of Hera's reaction if she found out.		
Persephone	Dionysus	In Orphic mysteries, Zeus begot Dionysus on the chthonic goddess Persephone. Hera unleashed the Titans on the infant god, who then dismembered and devoured him. In this cosmogony, Dionysus was reborn through Semele.	Nonnus distinguishes the two Dionysuses by calling Persephone's son Zagreus.	
Semele	Dionysus	Hera took the form of an elderly nurse and—after sowing doubt to Semele whether her lover truly was Zeus—convinced her to ask for Zeus to appear to her like he did to Hera (i.e. carrying his lightnings and thunderbolts). Zeus' fire burned Semele to death, but he saved Dionysus whom Hera pursued afterwards, including an incident where she inflicted him with madness.		
Thalia	Palici	The nymph Thalia buried herself or was buried by Zeus deep into the earth to avoid Hera's wrath. Additionally, Zeus turned Palicus into an eagle because of Hera's rage.	Also called Aetna in some authors.	

=== Trojan War ===
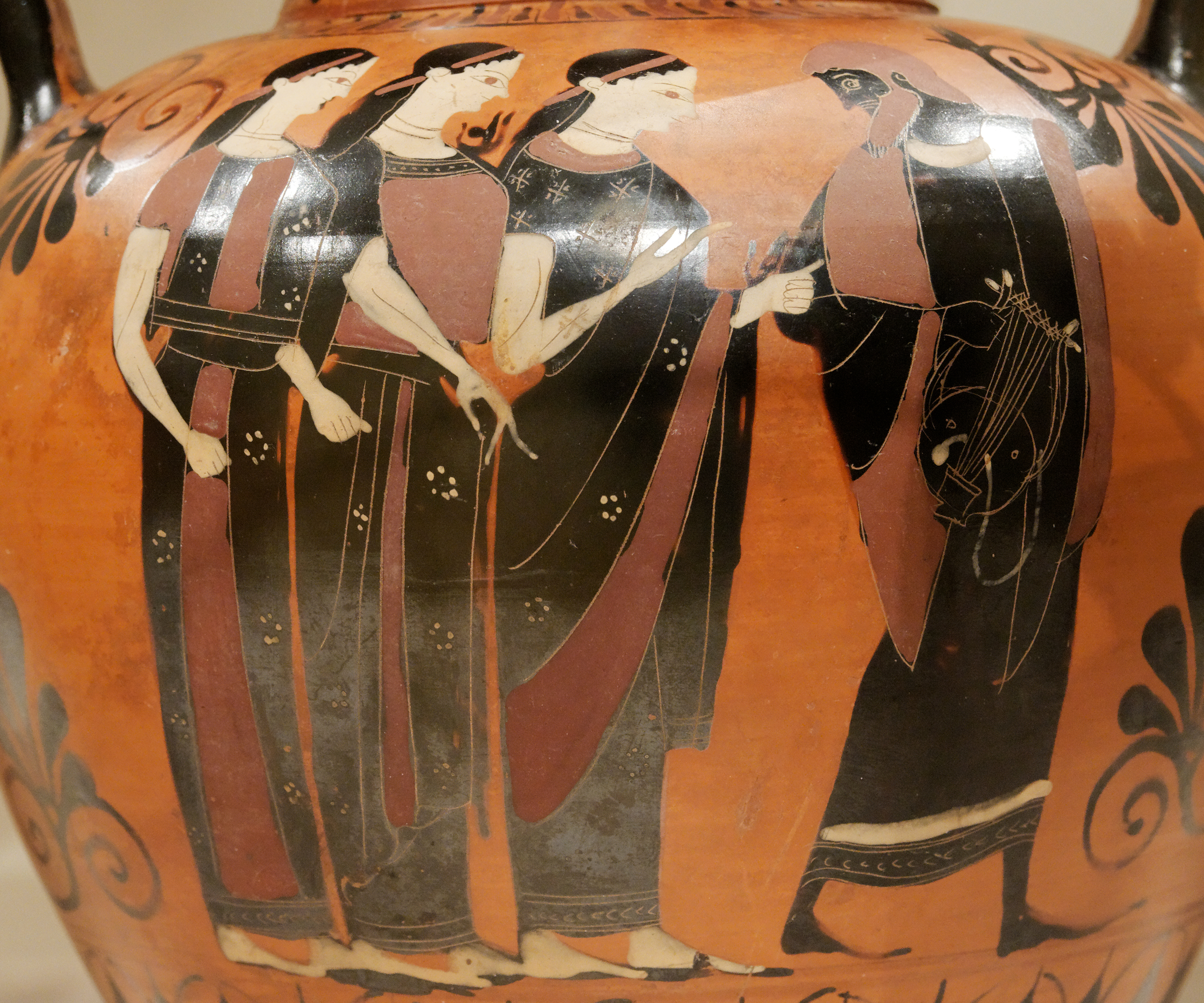
Judgement of Paris. Side B from an Attic black-figure neck amphora, 540–530 BC. Metropolitan Museum of Art

A prophecy stated that a son of the sea-goddess Thetis, with whom Zeus fell in love after gazing upon her in the oceans off the Greek coast, would become greater than his father. Possibly for this reason, Thetis was betrothed to an elderly human king, Peleus son of Aeacus, either upon Zeus's orders, or because she wished to please Hera, who had raised her. All the gods and goddesses as well as various mortals were invited to the marriage of Peleus and Thetis (the eventual parents of Achilles) and brought many gifts. Only Eris, goddess of discord, was not invited and was stopped at the door by Hermes, on Zeus's order. She was annoyed at this, so she threw from the door a gift of her own: a golden apple inscribed with the word καλλίστῃ (kallistēi, "to the fairest"). Aphrodite, Hera, and Athena all claimed to be the fairest, and thus the rightful owner of the apple.

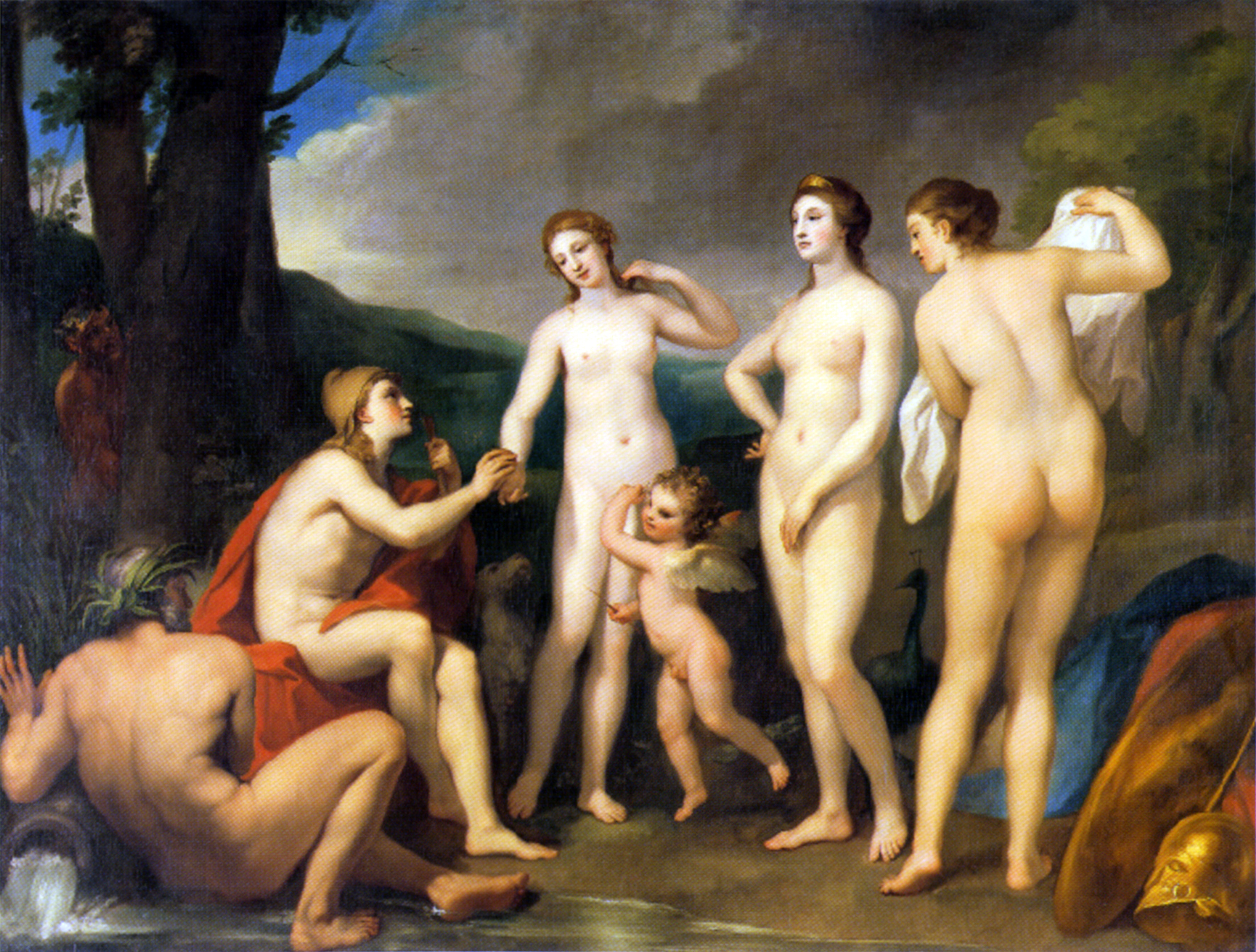
This is one of the many works depicting the event. Hera is the goddess in the center, wearing the crown. Das Urteil des Paris by Anton Raphael Mengs, ca. 1757

The goddesses quarreled bitterly over it, and none of the other gods would venture an opinion favoring one, for fear of earning the enmity of the other two. They chose to place the matter before Zeus, who, not wanting to favor one of the goddesses, put the choice into the hands of Paris, a Trojan prince. After bathing in the spring of Mount Ida where Troy was situated, they appeared before Paris to have him choose. The goddesses undressed before him, either at his request or for the sake of winning. Still, Paris could not decide, as all three were ideally beautiful, so they resorted to bribes. Hera offered Paris political power and control of all of Asia, while Athena offered wisdom, fame, and glory in battle, and Aphrodite offered the most beautiful mortal woman in the world as a wife, and he accordingly chose her. This woman was Helen, who was, unfortunately for Paris, already married to King Menelaus of Sparta. The other two goddesses were enraged by Paris's decision and, after the Trojan War started through Helen's abduction by Paris, they sided with the Greeks.

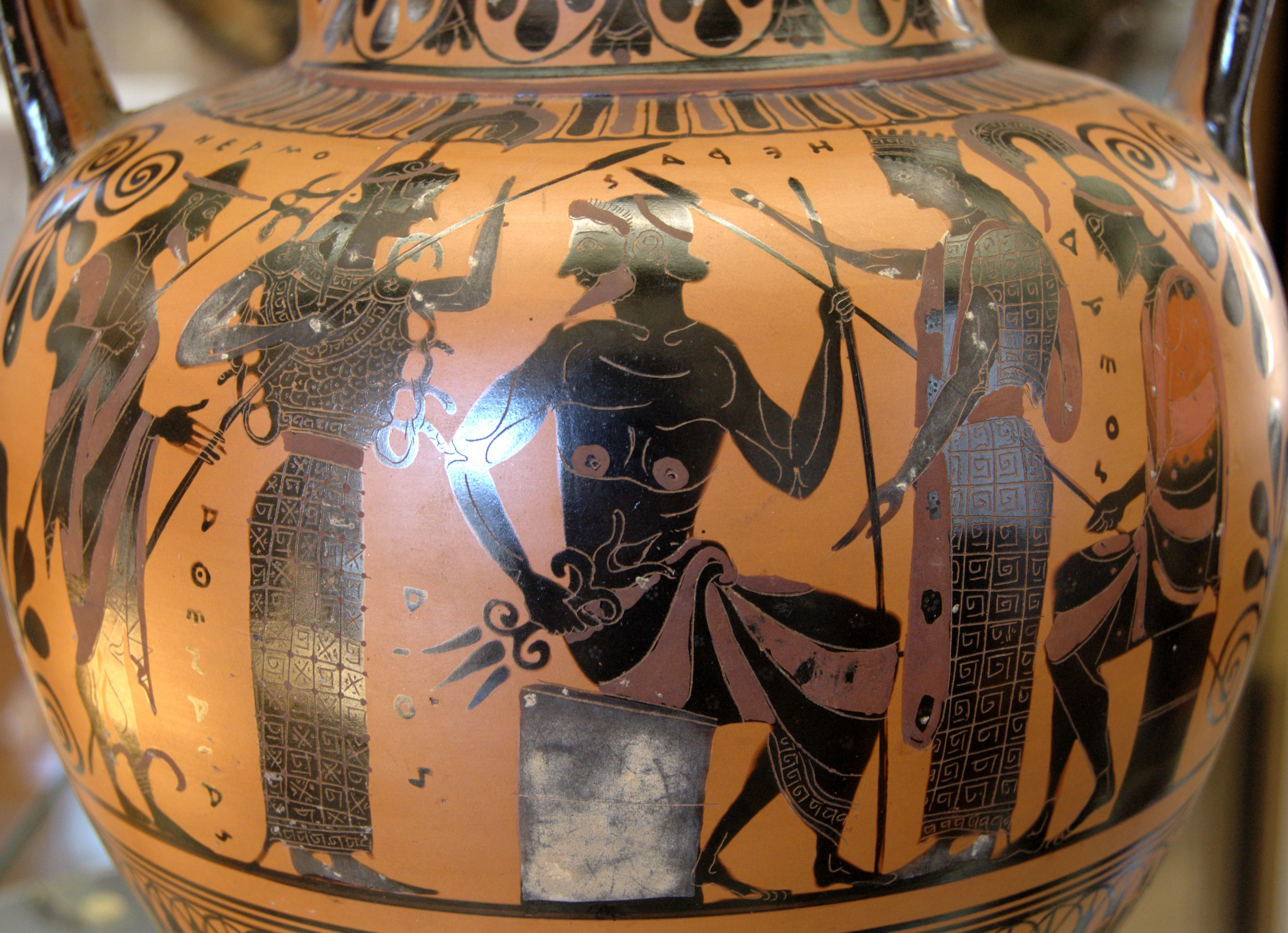
English: Hermes, Athena, Zeus (seated), Hera and Ares (all named). Side A of an Attic black-figure neck-amphora, end of 6th century BC. BnF Museum, Paris

Hera plays a substantial role in The Iliad, appearing in several books throughout the epic poem. She makes many attempts to thwart the Trojan Army. In Books 1 and 2, Hera declares that the Trojans must be destroyed and persuades Athena to aid the Achaeans in battle, and she agrees to assist with interfering on their behalf.

In Book 5, Hera and Athena plot to harm Ares, who had been seen by Diomedes in assisting the Trojans. Diomedes called for his soldiers to fall back slowly. Hera saw Ares's interference and asked Zeus for permission to drive Ares away from the battlefield. Hera encouraged Diomedes to attack Ares and he threw his spear at the god. Athena drove the spear into Ares's body, and he bellowed in pain and fled to Mount Olympus, forcing the Trojans to fall back.

In Book 8, Hera tries to persuade Poseidon to disobey Zeus and help the Achaean army. He refuses, saying he doesn't want to go against Zeus. Determined to intervene in the war, Hera and Athena head to the battlefield. However, seeing the two flee, Zeus sent Iris to intercept them and make them return to Mount Olympus or face grave consequences. After prolonged fighting, Hera sees Poseidon aiding the Greeks and giving them the motivation to keep fighting.

In Book 14 Hera devises a plan to deceive Zeus. Zeus set a decree that the gods were not allowed to interfere in the mortal war. Hera is on the side of the Achaeans, so she plans a Deception of Zeus where she seduces him, with help from Aphrodite, and tricks him into a deep sleep, with the help of Hypnos, so that the gods could interfere without the fear of Zeus.

In Book 21, Hera continues her interference with the battle as she tells Hephaestus to prevent the river from harming Achilles. Hephaestus sets the battlefield ablaze, causing the river to plead with Hera, promising her he will not help the Trojans if Hephaestus stops his attack. Hephaestus stops his assault and Hera returns to the battlefield where the gods begin to fight amongst themselves. After Apollo declines to battle Poseidon, Artemis eagerly engages Hera for a duel. Hera however treats the challenge as unimportant, easily disarming the haughty rival goddess and beating her with her own weapons. Artemis is left retreating back to Mount Olympus in tears to cry at Zeus's lap.

=== Minor stories ===
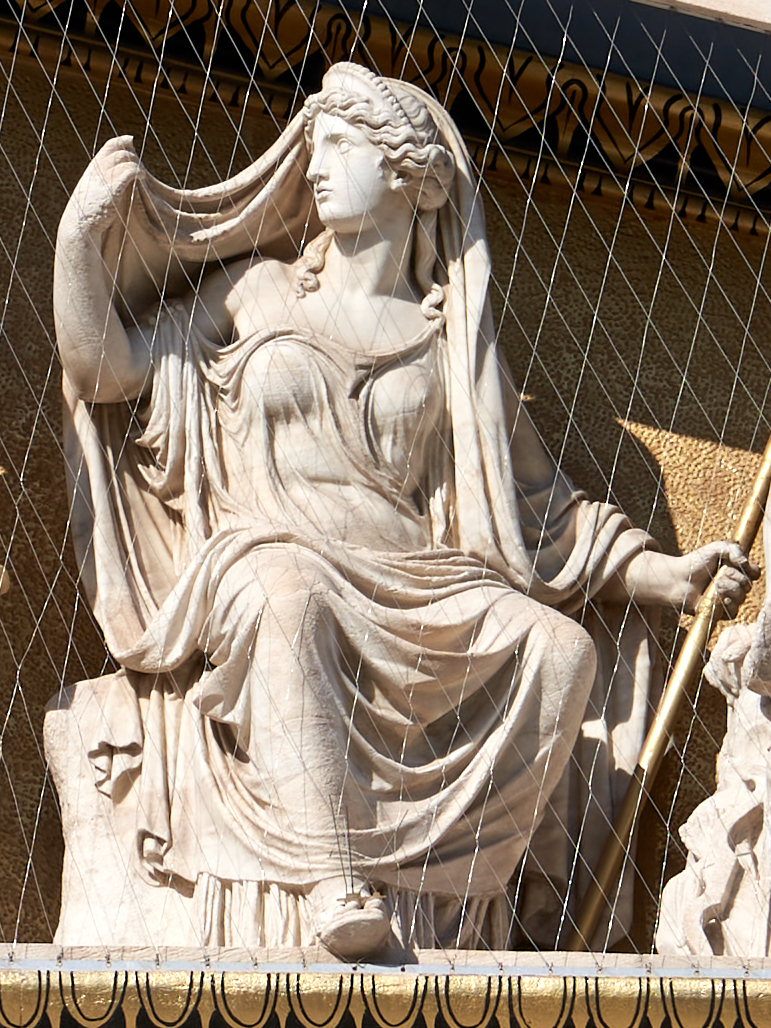
Hera in the pediment of the Academy of Athens.

==== The Golden Fleece ====
Hera hated Pelias, king of Iolcus, because he had killed Sidero, his step-grandmother, in one of her temples. She later convinced his nephew Jason to kill Pelias. The Golden Fleece was the item that Jason needed to get his mother Alcimide freed, which he obtained with the help of the sorceress Medea, who was influenced by the goddess. At the request of Hera, Aeolus calmed all the winds but the "steady" west wind, to aid their crew, the Argonauts, on their journey home.

==== Cydippe ====
Cydippe, a priestess of Hera, was on her way to a festival in the goddess's honor. The oxen which were to pull her cart were overdue and her sons, Biton and Cleobis, pulled the cart the entire way (45 stadia, 8 kilometers). Cydippe was impressed with their devotion to her and Hera, and so asked Hera to give her children the best gift a god could give a person. Hera ordained that the brothers would die in their sleep. This honor bestowed upon the children was later used by Solon as proof when trying to convince Croesus that it is impossible to judge a person's happiness until they have died a fruitful death after a joyous life.

==== Ixion ====
When Zeus had pity on Ixion and brought him to Olympus and introduced him to the gods, instead of being grateful, Ixion grew lustful for Hera. Zeus found out about his intentions and made a cloud in the shape of Hera, who was later named Nephele, and tricked Ixion into coupling with it. From their union came Centaurus. So Ixion was expelled from Olympus and Zeus ordered Hermes to bind Ixion to a winged fiery wheel that was always spinning. Therefore, Ixion was bound to a burning solar wheel for all eternity, first spinning across the heavens, but in later myth transferred to Tartarus.

==== Olympian Rebellion ====
In the Iliad, Homer tells of another attempted overthrow, in which Hera, Poseidon, and Athena conspire to overpower Zeus and tie him in bonds. It is only because of Thetis, who summons Briareus, one of the Hecatoncheires, to Olympus, that the other Olympians abandon their plans (out of fear for Briareus).

==== Aëtos ====
According to the myth, Aëtos was a beautiful boy born of the earth. While Zeus was young and hiding in Crete from his father Cronus who had devoured all of Zeus's siblings, Aëtos became friends with the god and was among the first beings to swear fealty to him as new king. But years later, after Zeus had overthrown his father and become king in his place, Zeus's wife Hera turned Aëtos into an eagle, out of fear that Zeus loved him. Thus the eagle became the sacred bird of Zeus, and a symbol of power and kingship.

==== Tiresias ====
Tiresias was a priest of Zeus, and as a young man, he encountered two snakes mating and hit them with a stick. He was then transformed into a woman. As a woman, Tiresias became a priestess of Hera, married, and had children, including Manto. After seven years as a woman, Tiresias again found mating snakes; depending on the myth, either she made sure to leave the snakes alone this time, or, according to Hyginus, trampled on them and became a man once more.

As a result of his experiences, Zeus and Hera asked him to settle the question of which sex, male or female, experienced more pleasure during intercourse. Zeus claimed it was women; Hera claimed it was men. When Tiresias sided with Zeus, Hera struck him blind. Since Zeus could not undo what she had done, he gave him the gift of prophecy.

An alternative and less commonly told story has it that Tiresias was blinded by Athena after he stumbled onto her bathing naked. His mother, Chariclo, begged her to undo her curse, but Athena could not; she gave him a prophecy instead.

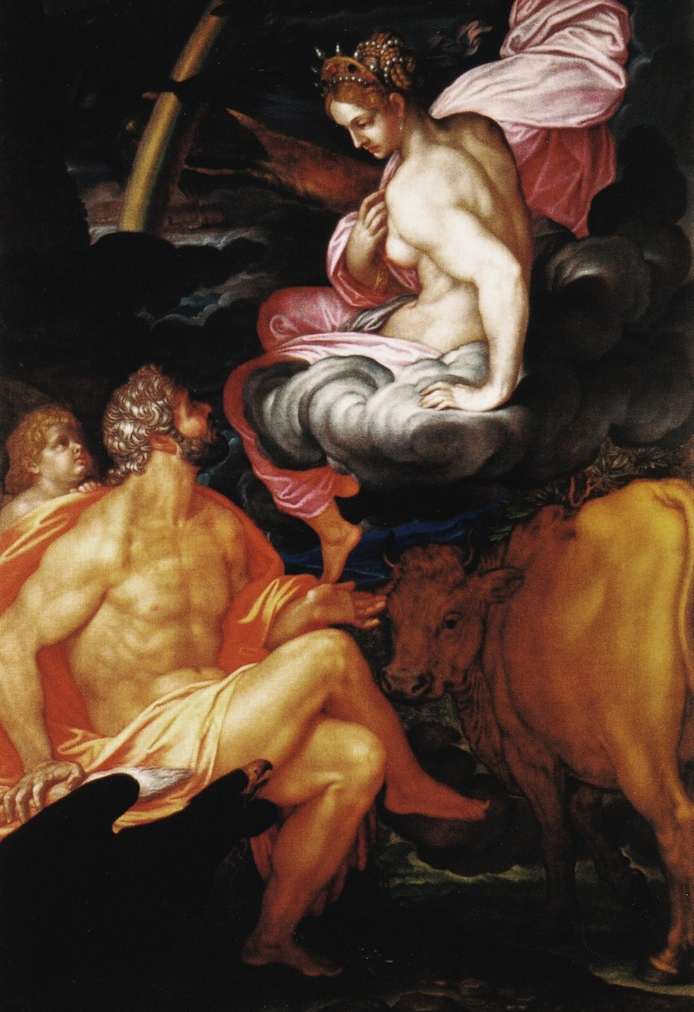
Io with Zeus by Giovanni Ambrogio Figino, 1599

==== Io and Argus ====
The myth of Io has many forms and embellishments. Generally, Io was a priestess of Hera at the Heraion of Argos. Zeus lusted after her and either Hera turned Io into a heifer to hide her from Zeus, or Zeus did so to hide her from Hera but was discovered. Hera had Io tethered to an olive-tree and set Argus Panoptes (lit. 'all-seeing') to watch over her, but Zeus sent Hermes to kill him. Infuriated, Hera then sent a gadfly (Greek oistros, compare oestrus) to pursue and constantly sting Io, who fled into Asia and eventually reached Egypt. There Zeus restored her to human form and she gave birth to his son Epaphus.

==== Gerana ====
Gerana was a queen of the Pygmies who boasted she was more beautiful than Hera. The wrathful goddess turned her into a crane and proclaimed that her bird descendants should wage eternal war on the Pygmy folk.

==== Lamia ====
Lamia was a lovely queen of Libya, whom Zeus loved; Hera in jealousy robbed Lamia of their children, either by kidnapping and hiding them away, killing them, or causing Lamia herself to kill her own offspring. Lamia became disfigured from the torment, transforming into a terrifying being who hunted and killed the children of others.

=== Children ===
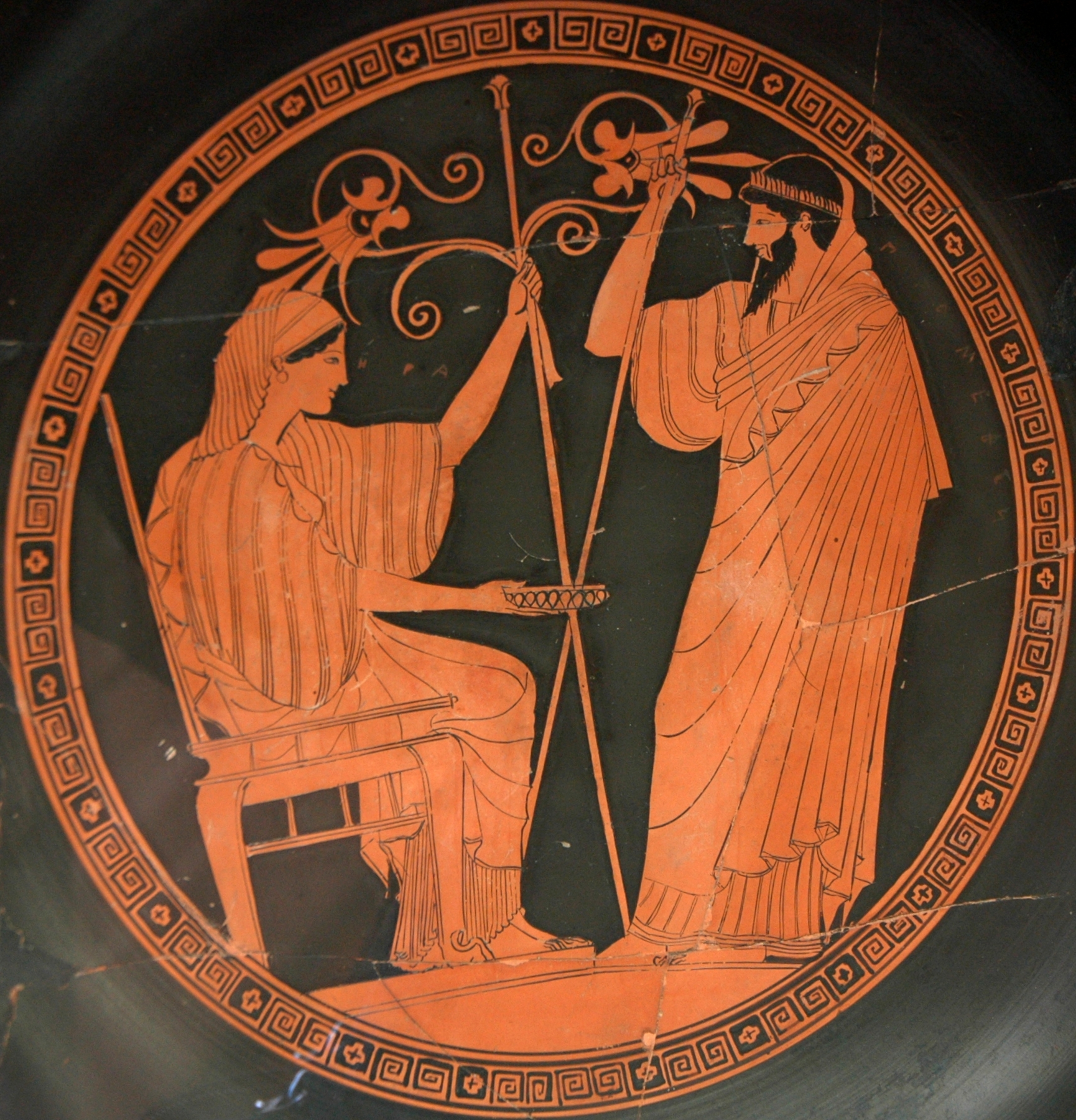
Hera and Prometheus, tondo of a 5th-century BCE cup from Vulci, Etruria

Name	Father	Functions	Explanation
Angelos	Zeus	An underworld goddess	Her story only survives in scholia on Theocritus's Idyll 2. She was raised by nymphs. One day she stole Hera's anointments and gave them away to Europa. To escape her mother's wrath, she tried to hide. Hera eventually ceased prosecuting her, and Zeus ordered the Cabeiroi to cleanse Angelos. They performed the purification rite in the waters of the Acherusia Lake in the Underworld. Consequently, she received the world of the dead as her realm of influence, and was assigned the epithet katachthonia ("she of the underworld").
Ares	Zeus	God of war	According to Hesiod's Theogony, he was a son of Zeus and Hera.
Arge	Zeus	A nymph	A nymph daughter of Zeus and Hera.
Charites	Not named	Goddesses of grace and beauty	Though usually considered as the daughters of Zeus and Eurynome, or Dionysus and Coronis according to Nonnus, the poet Colluthus makes them the daughters of Hera, without naming a father.
Eileithyia	Zeus	Goddess of childbirth	In Theogony and other sources, she is described as a daughter of Hera by Zeus. Although, the meticulously accurate mythographer Pindar in Seventh Nemean Ode mentions Hera as Eileithyia's mother but makes no mention of Zeus.
Eleutheria	Zeus	Personification of liberty	Eleutheria is the Greek counterpart of Libertas (Liberty), daughter of Jupiter (Zeus) and Juno (Hera) as cited in Hyginus, Fabulae Preface.
Hebe	Zeus	Goddess of youth	She was a daughter of Zeus and Hera. In a rare alternative version, Hera alone produced Hebe after being impregnated by eating lettuce. A fragment by Callimachus describes Hera holding a feast to celebrate the seventh day after the birth of Hebe. Pindar states that Hebe stays by her mother's side in Olympus forever.
Hephaestus	Zeus	God of fire and the forge	Attested by Hesiod, Hera was jealous of Zeus's giving birth to Athena with Metis, so she gave birth to Hephaestus without union with Zeus (though Homer has Hephaestus refer to "father Zeus"). In some versions, Zeus threw Hephaestus off Mount Olympus because he protected Hera from his advances. In other versions, Hera was the one who threw Hephaestus out of disgust for his ugliness. He gained revenge against Hera for rejecting him by making her a magical throne that did not allow her to leave once she sat on it. The other gods begged Hephaestus to return to Olympus to let her go, but he repeatedly refused. Dionysus got him drunk and took him back to Olympus on the back of a mule. Hephaestus released Hera after being given Aphrodite as his wife.
Pasithea	Dionysus (?)	One of the Graces	Although in other works Pasithea doesn't seem to be born to Hera, Nonnus made the Grace Hera's daughter. Elsewhere in the book, Pasithea's father is said to be Dionysus, but it's unclear whether those two together are meant to be Pasithea's parents. (Note: Throughout the epic, Nonnus gives conflicting parentages of various characters: for example Helios's daughter Astris's mother in book 17 seems to be Clymene while it's Ceto in Book 26, and Lelantos's daughter Aura's mother is Cybele in Book 1, but Periboea in Book 48. Moreover, Pasithea is described as one of the Graces, and elsewhere in the poem the Graces' parents are given as Dionysus and Coronis.)
Prometheus	Eurymedon	God of forethought	Although usually Prometheus is said to be the son of Iapetus by his wife Clymene or Asia, Hellenistic poet Euphorion made Prometheus the son of Hera by the giant Eurymedon, who raped the young goddess while she was still living with her parents.
Typhon	–	Serpent-monster	Typhon is presented both as the son of Hera (in Homeric Pythian Hymn to Apollo) and as the son of Gaia (in Hesiod's Theogony). According to the Homeric Hymn to Apollo (6th century BCE), Typhon was the parthenogenous child of Hera, whom she bore alone as a revenge at Zeus who had given birth to Athena. Hera prayed to Gaia to give her a son as strong as Zeus, then slapped the ground and became pregnant. Hera gave the infant Typhon to the serpent Python to raise, and Typhon grew up to become a great bane to mortals. The b scholia to Iliad 2.783, however, has Typhon born in Cilicia as the offspring of Cronus. Gaia, angry at the destruction of the Giants, slanders Zeus to Hera. So Hera goes to Cronus and he gives her two eggs smeared with his own semen, telling her to bury them, and that from them would be born one who would overthrow Zeus. Hera, angry at Zeus, buries the eggs in Cilicia "under Arimon", but when Typhon is born, Hera, now reconciled with Zeus, informs him.

== Genealogy ==
Hera's family tree

Gaia
Uranus
Uranus's genitals	Coeus	Phoebe	Cronus	Rhea
Leto	Zeus	HERA	Poseidon	Hades	Demeter	Hestia
Apollo	Artemis	a
b
Ares	Hephaestus
Metis
Athena
Maia
Hermes
Semele
Dionysus
Dione
a	b
Aphrodite

== Art and events ==
- Barberini Hera - a Roman sculpture of Hera/Juno
- Hera Borghese - a sculpture related to Hera
- Hera Farnese - a sculpture of Hera's head
- Heraea Games - games dedicated to Hera—the first sanctioned (and recorded) women's athletic competition to be held in the stadium at Olympia.

== See also ==
- Auðumbla, a primeval cow in Norse mythology
- Parvati
