= Candara (Paphlagonia) =

Town of ancient Paphlagonia

Coordinates: 40°55′25″N 33°39′03″E

Candara or Kandara (Ancient Greek: Κάνδαρα) was a town of ancient Paphlagonia, inhabited from Achaemenid through Roman times. Stephanus of Byzantium writes that it was "in Paphlagonia, three schoeni from Gangra, and a village Thariba" and that a temple of Hera Candarene was there.

Its site is tentatively located near Candere, Asiatic Turkey.
