= Angelos (mythology) =

Deity of the Underworld in Greek mythology

In Greek mythology, Angelos (Ancient Greek: Ἄγγελος) or Angelia (Ἀγγελία) was a daughter of Zeus and Hera.

== Mythology ==
Angelos' story only survives in scholia on Theocritus' Idyll 2. Angelos was raised by nymphs to whose care her father had entrusted her. One day she stole her mother Hera's anointments and gave them away to Europa. To escape Hera's wrath, she had to hide first in the house of a woman in labor, and next among people who were carrying a dead man. Hera eventually ceased from prosecuting her, and Zeus ordered the Cabeiroi to cleanse Angelos. They performed the purification rite in the waters of the Acherusia Lake in the Underworld. Consequently, she received the world of the dead as her realm of influence, and was assigned an epithet katachthonia ("she of the underworld").

The story of Angelos is cited by the scholiast in a series of rare myths concerning the birth of Hecate, which makes it possible to think that Angelos was essentially equal to Hecate. This is to some extent confirmed by the fact that, according to Hesychius, Angelos was a surname of Artemis in Syracuse, being that Artemis as goddess of the moon was identified with Hecate. Angelos could be an early version of Hecate, the one that pertained both to the upper world and the underworld, similar to the position of Persephone.
