= Adranon =

Ancient polis of Magna Graecia

Adranon / Adranos
- Ἀδρανόν / Ἀδρανός (Ancient Greek)
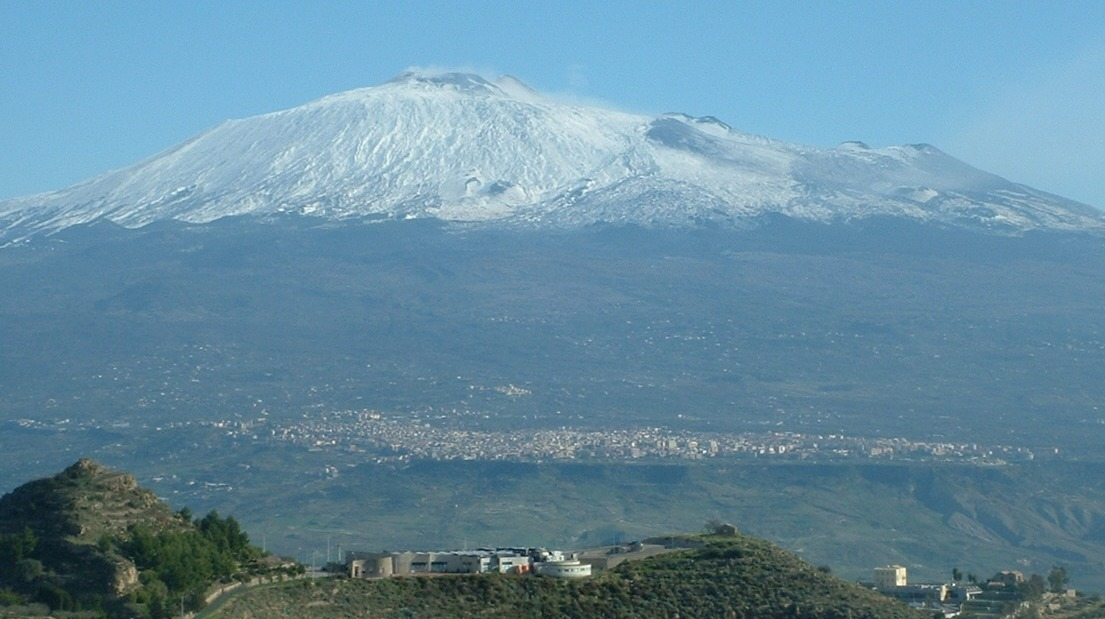
- Adranon panorama with Etna

- Location within Italy
- 37°40′N 14°50′E
- Type: Human settlement
- Location: Province of Catania
- Region: Sicily

History
- Built: Neolithic, Greek colonization

Site notes
- Website: regione.sicilia.it (Museo di Adranon)

Adranon (Ancient Greek: Ἀδρανόν) or Adranos (Ancient Greek: Ἀδρανός), present day Adrano, was an ancient polis of Magna Graecia on the southwestern slopes of Mount Etna, near Simeto River.

It was known for the "simetite" variety of amber.

The ancient city was founded by the ancient Greek ruler Dionysius I of Syracuse around 400 BC upon a pre-Hellenic neolithic settlement, near a temple dedicated to the god Adranus, worshiped throughout Sicily. Adranus was associated with volcanoes and equated eventually with Hephaestus. The city was conquered by Timoleon at 343-342 BC and subjugated to Rome in 263 BC. Romans declared it a civitas stipendiaria (city that had to pay tribute to Rome).

== The archaeological site ==
The archaeological site has been explored at the beginning of this century, but the first excavations took place in 1959. The north side of the site is buried under modern buildings. The perimeter walls delimit the ancient city on the East and West sides. On the south side, along the river, a steep ravine was used for the defense of the city. The walls were built of basalt ashlar and are in good condition on the east side. In the northeastern edge of the wall the existing rectangular tower is incorporated in St. Francis Church.

== From prehistory to the Classical Era ==
It seems that the Adranon region was inhabited in prehistoric times, as shown by recent findings of the Neolithic period in districts of the modern city. Traces also have been found of indigenous peoples human settlements during historic era. Not yet excavated, except for a small part, there is a native town of Mendolito region, connected to Adranon's topography, whose name remains unknown to date. According to Α. Franco this anonymous settlement of Contrada Mendolito is identified as Piakos, (Ancient Greek: Πίακος). G. K. Jenkins who published a coin with the obverse legend ΠΙΑΚΙΝΟΣ (PIAKINOS) and ΑΔΡΑΝ (ADRAN) on the reverse, recognized ΑΔΡΑΝ as ΑΔΡΑΝΟΝ (ADRANON), a numismatic evidence of connection between Piakos and Adranon. Other researches identify ΑΔΡΑΝ[...] as ΑΔΡΑΝΙΤΩΝ, the ethnic in the genitive case.

Important are the findings of the eighth or seventh century BC, which include among others a treasure-trove of bronze artefacts and a gate of the city of 6th century BC, with a Sicel inscription not yet deciphered. Several other finds in the area are now in the Archaeological Museum of Ardano.

The exact location of the Temple of Adranus, whose cult probably linked to the activity of Etna, is still unknown. Sixteen basaltic pillars are now part of the internal structure of contemporary temple Chiesa Madre, standing next to the Norman castle in Umberto I Square. Therefore, it has been hypothesized that the temple of the Adranus is in the same area. Among other finds, the settlement of Politselo region yielded a wonderful sample of Sicilian art of the fifth century BC, the bronze figure of a naked athlete (exhibit at the Syracuse Museum).

Excavations of classical strata revealed so far residences of the 4th century BC, with Italiote pottery red-figure of good style, and interesting treasure of modern currencies. No other monument of the city is yet known. The polis minted coins during Timoleon's rule with the figure of Adranus the river deity. Two successive excavations have investigated the walls and part of the ancient cemetery lying southeast of the city (Sciare Manganelli). The graves belong to a type uncommon in Sicily, consisting of small circular structures in the lava stone that are vaguely reminiscent of Mycenaean domes (tholoi).
