= Sikanos =

In Greek mythology, Sikanos is a Sicilian who gave his name to the Sicans (Greek Σικανοί, Sikanoi), an ancient people who settled in Sicily. He was son of the giant Briareus and brother Aetna. Sikanos had three sons: Kyklops, Antipates and Polyphemos.
