= Silenus (disambiguation) =

Silenus, Silen or Sileni may refer to:

== Mythology ==
- Silenus, a satyr and companion to Dionysus
  - Silen and its plural sileni may refer to the mythological figure as a type that is sometimes thought to be differentiated from a satyr
- Satyr, also known as a silenos, a male nature spirit

== Biology ==
- A butterfly, Myrina silenus
- A damselfly, Drepanosticta silenus
- The lion-tailed macaque, Macaca silenus
- The prowfish, Zaprora silenus

== People ==
- Silenus Calatinus, a 2nd century BC Sicilian Greek historian

== Other ==
- Šílení (Lunacy), a 2005 Czech film
