= Chiesa Madre Maria Santissima Assunta, Adrano =

Roman Catholic church in Sicily, Italy

Coordinates: 37.66280°N 14.83150°E

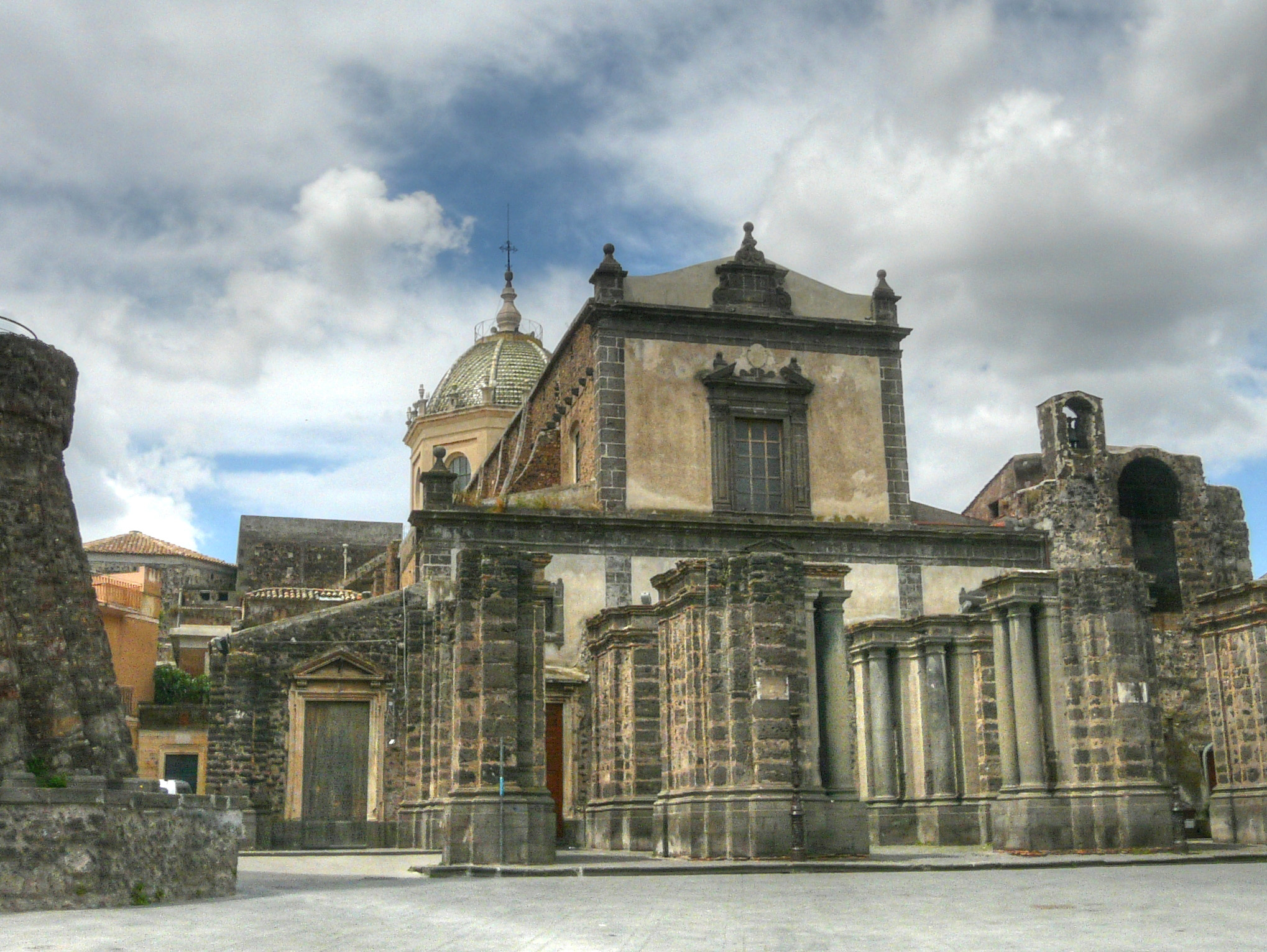
Facade with pilasters of unbuilt campanile, on the left corner of the photo is the base of the Norman Castle

The Chiesa Madre (Mother Church), dedicated to Maria Santissima Assunta (Holiest Mary of the Assumption) is the largest Roman Catholic church in Adrano, and located in center of town, adjacent to the Norman Castle of the town, in the region of Sicily, Italy.

== History and description ==
A church at the site was first commissioned in the 11th century by the initial Norman conquerors, specifically Roger II of Sicily, who would have been building the church adjacent to his Norman castle. The site was named Piano della Cuba, perhaps because it already housed a house of worship at this site. The layout of the present church is mainly due to works patronized by Duke Francesco II Moncada between 1572 and 1592. This led to the building of the nave with two aisles and two side chapels. In 1750 a dome was built, tiled on the outer surface with painted bricks.

The façade is framed with dark lava stone pilasters. In the tympanum above the portal is a marble depiction of the Assumption of the Virgin. The side portals have lava stone jambs surmounted by a triangular tympanum in Baroque style. In front of the church are lava stone pillars that were meant to support at tall bell-tower, commissioned in the late 19th century by the provost Salvatore Petronio Russo, and designed by Carlo Sada. This expensive project became mired due to costs and disputes, and after decades of fitful construction only a skeletal bell-tower was present by 1957. In 1997, church and civil authorities agreed to demolish the tower. The base pilasters remain.

The central nave is flanked on each side by eight solid basalt columns. Tradition holds these columns belonged to an Ancient Roman temple in the town. The Chapel of the Holiest Sacrament at the left in the transept has an altarpiece depicting the Last Supper (16th-century), attributed to the Luis de Morales. In the Chapel of the Sacred Heart on the right, there are 19th-century altarpieces, depicting the Repentance of the Magdalene and the Apparition of Jesus to Beata Alacoque by Giuseppe Guzzardi.

In the apse flanking the main altar are frescoes depicting events of the life of the town's patron San Nicolò Politi: Angel warns him of Death and Death of the Saint, painted by Angelo La Naia. To the left of the main altar is a chapel with an Assumption of the Virgin (1764) by Alessandro Vasta, son of Pietro Paolo. The main altar is flanked by a wooden choir (1774) by Spedalieri di Troina brothers. In the transept, there are four 17th-century paintings attributed to the school of Zoppo di Gangi depicting: King Solomon, King David Crowned, the Virgin of the Annunciation, and the Archangel Gabriel. Above the baptistery there is an altarpiece, likely Flemish and dated 1723, depicting The Genesis of Sin.

Above the central portal is the Moncada Polyptych originally commissioned by the Moncada family for the apse of the church of Sant'Antonio Abate, but moved here between 1915 and 1920. The early 16th-century author of the work is unknown, though among the possible attributions are Salvo di Antonio, nephew of Antonello da Messina or a follower of Cesare da Sesto. Among the scenes depicted are the Incredulity of Saint Thomas; the Holy Family and Saints; St Antony Abbot, St John the Evangelist, and Christ Pantocrater.
