= Santa Maria del Rosario, Adrano =

Renaissance Roman Catholic church

Coordinates: 37.66422°N 14.83317°E

Santa Maria del Rosario (St Mary of the Rosary) is a Roman Catholic church located on via San Pietro #100, alongside the former convent of San Domenico, in Adrano, in the region of Sicily, Italy.

== History and description ==
While the Dominicans had arrived in Adrano in 1479, they only moved to this site in 1593, where they built the convent and church. The facade has a flat sober Renaissance style, with portal and windows made of black lava stone. Above the portal are the coat of arms of the Dominican order.

The interior has a barrel vault single nave. The main altar (1785) was made with polychrome marble and has statues of two Dominican saints: Thomas Aquinas and Dominic. The main altarpiece depicts the Martyrdom of San Pietro da Verona (1621) by Salvatore Bellomo. The apse was frescoed in 1928 by Angelo La Naia, who has painted in the church a Santa Teresa's Vision of the Child Jesus.
