= Alfio Santangelo =

Member of the Sicilian mafia

Alfio Santangelo (born 1953), known as ‘U’ Taccuni, is a Sicilian mafioso, recognized as the historical leader of the Santangelo faction based in Adrano, a town in the province of Catania. His faction is a prominent subgroup within the broader Catania Mafia family.

== Criminal career ==
Born in 1953, Santangelo’s criminal trajectory spans decades, during which he solidified his reputation as a high-ranking mafia boss. According to the testimony of the pentito (turncoat) Vincenzo Rosano, Santangelo became the capo of the Cosa Nostra in the city of Adrano after Pippo Pellegriti's defection in the 1980s.

Despite having spent approximately 20 years behind bars until 2008, investigations and multiple testimonies reveal that he continued to exercise control over his organization from prison. Key pentiti like Valerio Rosano and Aldo Navarria testified that Santangelo approved new memberships, controlled the distribution of criminal proceeds, including salaries to affiliates, and played a pivotal role in strategic decision-making through intermediated communications.

Santangelo was arrested multiple times over the years. In 2009, as part of the operation "Terra Bruciata," law enforcement dismantled parts of his clan and that of their rivals, the Scalisi group. In 2015, he was arrested again to serve a sentence of 13 years and 4 months for mafia association, drug trafficking, and illegal arms possession. The same operation also led to the conviction of his two sons-in-law, Nino Crimi and Antonino Quaceci, as well as associate Giuseppe La Mela.

According to investigators, he was involved in high-level mafia summits and coordinated drug trafficking operations, allegedly distributing up to 10 kilograms of cocaine weekly to various Catania-based groups. He is also believed to have had ties with the 'Ndrangheta in Calabria, further expanding his drug supply network.

One significant summit recounted by pentiti occurred around 2014–2016, where Santangelo met with major mafia figures, including Francesco Santapaola, cousin of Nitto Santapaola, and Vito Romeo. These meetings often centred around extortion schemes and the management of large public contracts, such as those involving the Circumetnea railway. Santangelo was reportedly instrumental in organizing the sharing of illicit proceeds from these contracts among various mafia factions.

In 2020, Italian authorities confiscated five properties belonging to Santangelo, valued at approximately €350,000, on the grounds that they were acquired through criminal activity. Despite these legal blows, the Santangelo clan remained active in Adrano and neighboring towns, continuing to pursue drug trafficking and extortion activities.
