= Thalia (nymph) =

Nymph, daughter of Hephaestus

In Greek mythology, Thalia or Thaleia (/ˈθeɪliə/ or /θəˈlaɪə/; Ancient Greek: Θάλεια Tháleia, "the joyous, the abundance", from θάλλειν / thállein, "to flourish, to be green") was a nymph daughter of Hephaestus, and the mother of the Palici.

== Mythology ==
Macrobius and Servius (who also calls her Aetna) state how Zeus had sex with her near the river Symaethus on Sicily. She buried herself (or Zeus buried her) in the ground to avoid Hera's jealousy and revenge. Her twin children, the Palici, were thus born under the earth, though other authors make the Palici the sons of Hephaestus or Adranus. According to a late-antiquity Christian author, Zeus seduced Thalia by transforming into a vulture.

== See also ==
- Thalia (Muse)
- Thalia (Nereid)
- Thalia (Grace)
