= Giardino della Vittoria, Adrano =

Coordinates: 37.66278°N 14.83418°E

The Giardino della Vittoria is a public park located in the center of the town of Adrano, in the Province of Catania, Sicily, Italy. The park rises on land once belonging to the former, but still adjacent, Monastery of Santa Lucia, whose facade and baroque church border on the north. The modern city hall rises along the northwest edge of the park.

The first idea for a park at the site arose circa 1800, and guides from 1907 mention a tree lined promenade (passeggiata). One of the prides of the park is a palm-lined passage. In 1920, plans were made to add a memorial to fallen soldiers (caduti) in the park. Plans were generated in 1925, and designs were commissioned from a local artist Angelo Lauricella. The bronze memorial was commissioned from Angelo La Naia, and the park or garden was inaugurated in 1926. Since the last world war, a number of sculptures have been added, mainly of prominent local citizens including Giuseppe Guzzardi, Domenico Sanfilippo, and Carmelo Salanitro.
