= The Kabeiroi =

Lost Ancient Greek tragedy by Aeschylus

The Kabeiroi (ancient Greek Κάβειροι, Kabeiroi), also known as Cabeiroi and Cabeiri, is an ancient Greek tragedy by Aeschylus which survives in three fragments. It was written between 499 and 456BC, and appears to have featured Jason and the Argonauts arriving on the island of Lemnos and being initiated into the mystery cult of the Kabeiroi. The title refers to the play's chorus, who were local chthonic deities associated with mystery religion and often considered to be sons or grandsons of Hephaistos. Lemnos was the location for a cult of the Kabeiroi from the sixth century BC onwards, and archaeological excavations confirm that initiation rites occurred there. In 2017 the fragments were reimagined by Punchdrunk as a six-hour durational performance which took place on the streets of London for just two audience members at a time.

== The Tetralogy ==
The play was part of one of only eleven known Aeschylean tetralogies, or instances where we can confidently identify all the plays that premiered together. It appeared as part of a lost tetralogy containing Aeschylus' Lemnian Women, Hypsipyle, and The Argo (also known as Oarsman). The scarcity of evidence makes reconstructing the plot of the tetralogy difficult; however, it seems most likely that Lemnian Women dramatised the Lemnian women's murder of their male relatives, The Kabeiroi involved the Argonauts arriving on Lemnos, being initiated into the mystery cult of the Kabeiroi, and procreating with the women, and that Hypsipyle, named after the Queen of Lemnos and mother of two children to Jason, dealt with the revelation of the homicides to the Argonauts and their consequent evacuation of the island.

== Fragments ==
Three fragments survive from The Kabeiroi. The first survives as a quotation in Athenaeus 9.373d, and reads 'But I do not treat you as an omen of my journey'. A second fragment is quoted in Plutarch (Moralia 632f-633a) and threatens to make 'the house scarce with respect to vinegar', while a final fragment reads 'That there shall never be a dearth of jars, either of wine or of water, in <this/your> wealthy home'.

== Other Evidence ==
A scholia to Pindar's Pythian 4 reveals that the play contained a catalogue of the Argonauts. Athenaeus 10.428 also records that the play was the first instance in which an individual appeared drunk in a tragedy. Burkert notes that wine vessels are the only characteristic group of finds from the Kabeiroi sanctuary on Lemnos; the emphasis of drunkenness in Athenaeus and wine in the fragments may emphasise the significance of wine in the initiation rituals associated with the Kabeiroi cult.

== Translations ==
• Alan H. Sommerstein, 2009 - prose
