= Cabeiri =

Greek divinities

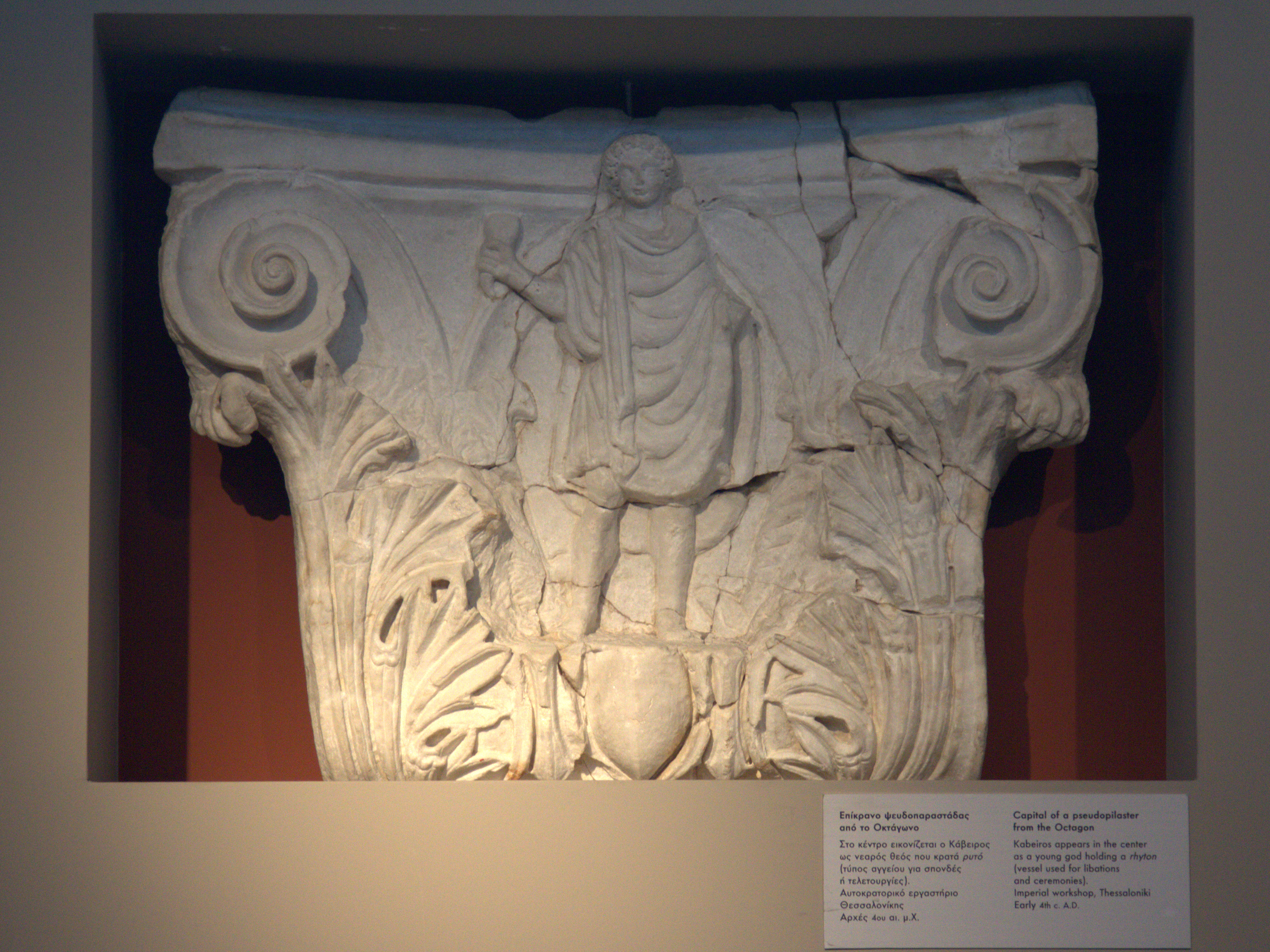
Cabirus relief on a capital of a pseudo-pilaster from the Palace of Galerius in Thessalonica, early 4th century.

In Greek mythology, the Cabeiri or Cabiri /kəˈbaɪriː/ (Ancient Greek: Κάβειροι, romanized: Kábeiroi), also transliterated Kabeiri or Kabiri, were a group of enigmatic chthonic deities. They were worshipped in a mystery cult closely associated with that of Hephaestus, centered in the north Aegean Islands of Lemnos and possibly Samothrace—at the Samothrace temple complex—and at Thebes. In their distant origins the Cabeiri and the Samothracian gods may include pre-Greek elements, or other non-Greek elements, such as Thracian, Tyrrhenian, Pelasgian, Phrygian or Hittite. The Lemnian cult was always local to Lemnos, but the Samothracian mystery cult spread rapidly throughout the Greek world during the Hellenistic period, eventually initiating Romans.

The ancient sources disagree about whether the deities of Samothrace were Cabeiri or not; and the accounts of the two cults differ in detail. But the two islands are close to each other, at the northern end of the Aegean, and the cults are at least similar, and neither fits easily into the Olympic pantheon: the Cabeiri were given a mythic genealogy as sons of Hephaestus and Cabeiro. The accounts of the Samothracian gods, whose names were secret, differ in the number and sexes of the gods: usually between two and four, some of either sex. The number of Cabeiri also varies, with some accounts citing four (often a pair of males and a pair of females), and some even more, such as a tribe or whole race of Cabeiri, often presented as all male. When represented as a pair of males and a pair of females the Cabeiri's most common names are Axiocersus and Cadmilus for the pair of males and Axierus and Axiocersa for the pair of females.

The Cabeiri were also worshipped at other sites in the vicinity, including Seuthopolis in Thrace and various sites in Asia Minor. One of these is posited to be Thessalonica and possibly was the cult of mysteries of which Paul warns against in his letters to the church there. According to Strabo, Cabeiri are most honored in Imbros and Lemnos but also in other cities too.

== Etymology and origin ==
=== Etymology ===
In the past, the Semitic word kabir ("great") has been compared to Κάβειροι since at least Joseph Justus Scaliger in the sixteenth century, but nothing else seemed to point to a Semitic origin, until the idea of "great" gods expressed by the Semitic root kbr was definitively attested for North Syria in the thirteenth century BCE, in texts from Emar published by D. Arnaud in 1985–87. Friedrich Wilhelm Schelling connected the Greek word to the Hebrew חבר (khaver "friend, associate") and via this to several priest names as one attached to the Persians ("Chaverim"), linking them to the Dioskouri or priestly blacksmiths alternatively. In 1925 A. H. Sayce had suggested a connection to Hittite habiri ("looters", "outlaws"), but subsequent discoveries have made this implausible on phonological grounds. Dossein compares Κάβειροι to the Sumerian word kabar, "copper." A connection with the Greek word Kaio (Greek: Καίω, lit. 'burn') has also been suggested, considering the nature of the Cabeiri as demons of volcanic fire; this was suggested by Friedrich Gottlieb Welcker and Louis Ferdinand Alfred Maury. Strabo wrote that the Cabeiri were named "after the mountain Kabeiros in Berekynthia". R. S. P. Beekes believes that their name is of non-Indo-European, pre-Greek origin.

The name of the Cabeiri recalls Mount Kabeiros, a mountain in the region of Berekyntia in Asia Minor, closely associated with the Phrygian Mother Goddess. The name of Kadmilus (Καδμῖλος), or Kasmilos, one of the Cabeiri who was usually depicted as a young boy, was linked even in antiquity to Camillus, an old Latin word for a boy-attendant in a cult, likely a loan from the Etruscan language, which may be related to Lemnian. However, according to Beekes, the name Kadmilus may be of pre-Greek origin, as seems to be the case with the name Cadmus.

=== Origin ===
The origins of the Cabeiri are unknown. Jacob Wackernagel posited that they were possibly originally Phrygian or Thracian deities and protectors of sailors, who were imported into Greek ritual. According to Encyclopedia Britannica, the deities may have been Pelasgian or Phrygian. It is not known who brought these deities to Greece, but it was probably a group of Greeks, perhaps only a family which settled on the countryside of Thebes.

== Depiction in literary sources ==
They were most commonly depicted as two people: an old man, Axiocersus, and his son, Cadmilus. Due to the cult's secrecy, however, their exact nature and relationship with other ancient Greek and Thracian religious figures remained mysterious. As a result, the membership and roles of the Cabeiri changed significantly over time, with common variants including a female pair (Axierus and Axiocersa) and twin youths (frequently confused with Castor and Pollux, who were also worshiped as protectors of sailors). Roman antiquarians identified the Cabeiri with the three Capitoline deities or with the Di Penates.

== Lemnos ==
The Lemnians were originally non-Greek; they were Hellenized after Miltiades conquered the island for Athens in the sixth century BCE. In Lemnos the cult of the Cabeiri survived, according to archaeological evidence, through the conquest: an ancient sanctuary dedicated to the Cabeiri is identifiable by traces of inscriptions, and seems to have survived the process of Hellenization. Walter Burkert records that wine jars are "the only characteristic group of finds" from the Cabeirium of Lemnos and that the Cabeirium was the location for initiation into an ancient mystery cult. However, due to the secret nature of mystery cults in the ancient world, little survives to indicate what was involved in these initiation ceremonies; indeed, Hugh Bowden notes that on the basis of our evidence we do not know what happened at Lemnos beyond the fact of initiation, and that "we have no descriptions and nothing on which even to base speculation". However, according to the Encyclopædia Britannica Eleventh Edition, Lemnos held an annual festival of the Cabeiri, lasting nine days, during which all the fires were extinguished and fire brought from Delos.

The geographer Strabo reported (Geogr. 10,3,21) that in Lemnos, the mother (there was no father) of the Cabeiri was Kabeiro (Greek: Καβειρώ) herself, a daughter of Proteus (one of the "old men of the sea") and a goddess whom the Greeks might have called Rhea.

In general Greek myth identifies the Cabeiri as divine craftsmen, sons or grandsons of Hephaestus, who was also chiefly worshipped on Lemnos. Aeschylus wrote a tragedy called The Kabeiroi, which apparently featured the deities as a chorus greeting the Argonauts at Lemnos and the Argonauts' initiation into the cult of the Cabeiri.

== Samothrace ==
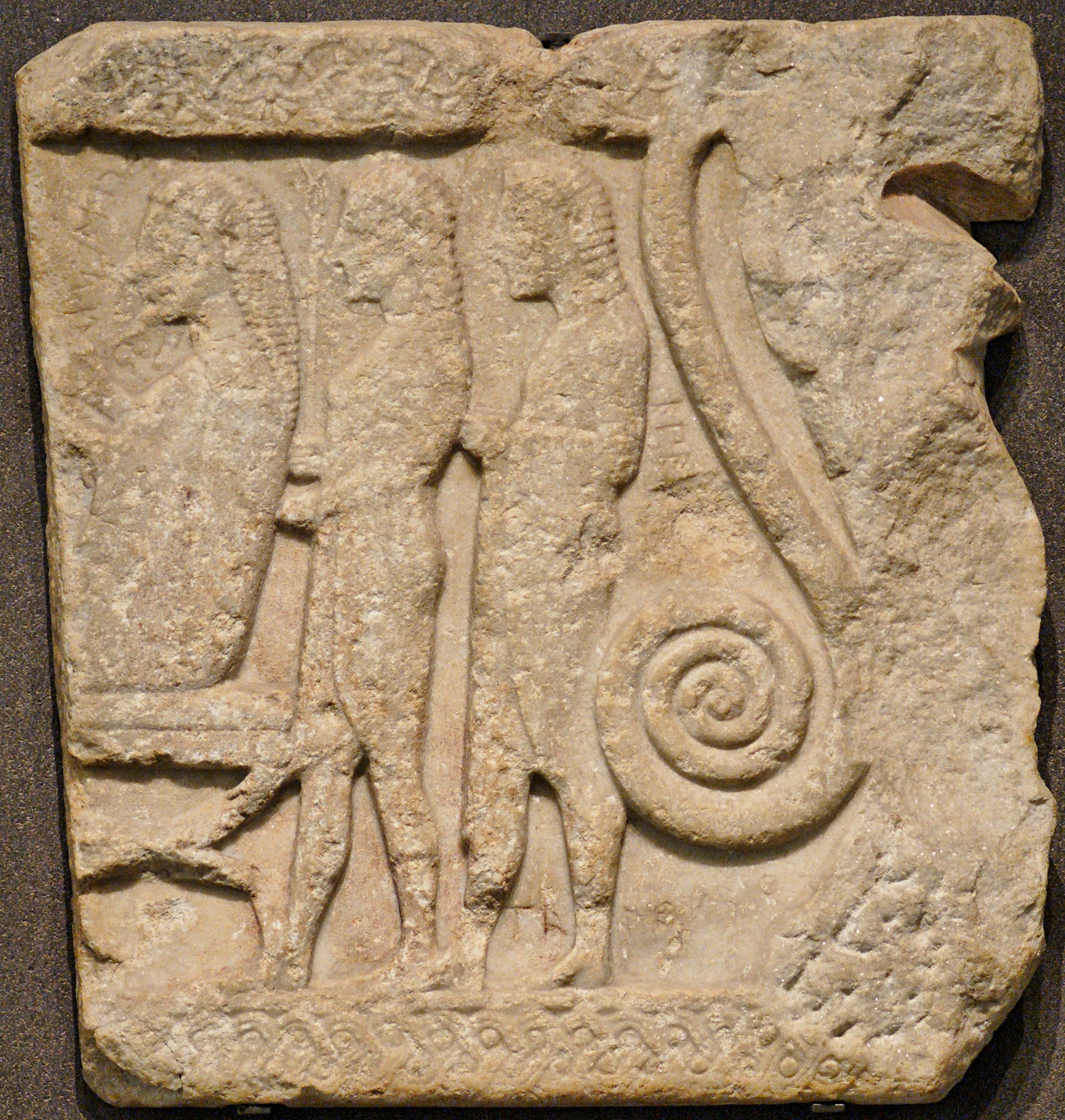
Agamemnon, Talthybius and Epeius, relief from Samothrace, ca. 560 BC, Louvre

The Samothracians were also originally non-Greek, and are associated with the Trojans and the Pelasgians; they used a foreign language in the temple through Julius Caesar's time. Samothrace offered an initiatory mystery, which promised safety and prosperity to seamen. The secret of these mysteries has largely been kept; but we know that of three things about the ritual, the aspirants were asked the worst action they had ever committed.

The mysteries of Samothrace did not publish the names of their gods; and the offerings at the shrine are all inscribed to the gods or to the great gods rather than with their names. But ancient sources tell us that there were two goddesses and a god: Axieros, Axiokersa, and Axiokersos, and their servant Cadmilos or Casmilos. Karl Kerényi conjectured that Axieros was male, and the three gods were the sons of Axiokersa (Cadmilos, the youngest, was also the father of the three); Burkert disagrees.

In Classical Greek culture the mysteries of the Cabeiri at Samothrace remained popular, though little was entrusted to writing beyond a few names and bare genealogical connections. Seamen among the Greeks might invoke the Cabeiri as "great gods" in times of danger and stress. The archaic sanctuary of Samothrace was rebuilt in Greek fashion; by classical times, the Samothrace mysteries of the Cabeiri were known at Athens. Herodotus had been initiated. But at the entrance to the sanctuary, which has been thoroughly excavated, the Roman antiquary Varro learned that there had been twin pillars of brass, phallic hermae, and that in the sanctuary it was understood that the child of the Goddess, Cadmilus, was in some mystic sense also her consort. Varro also describes these twin pillars as Heaven and Earth, denying the vulgar error that they are Castor and Pollux.

== Thebes in Boeotia ==
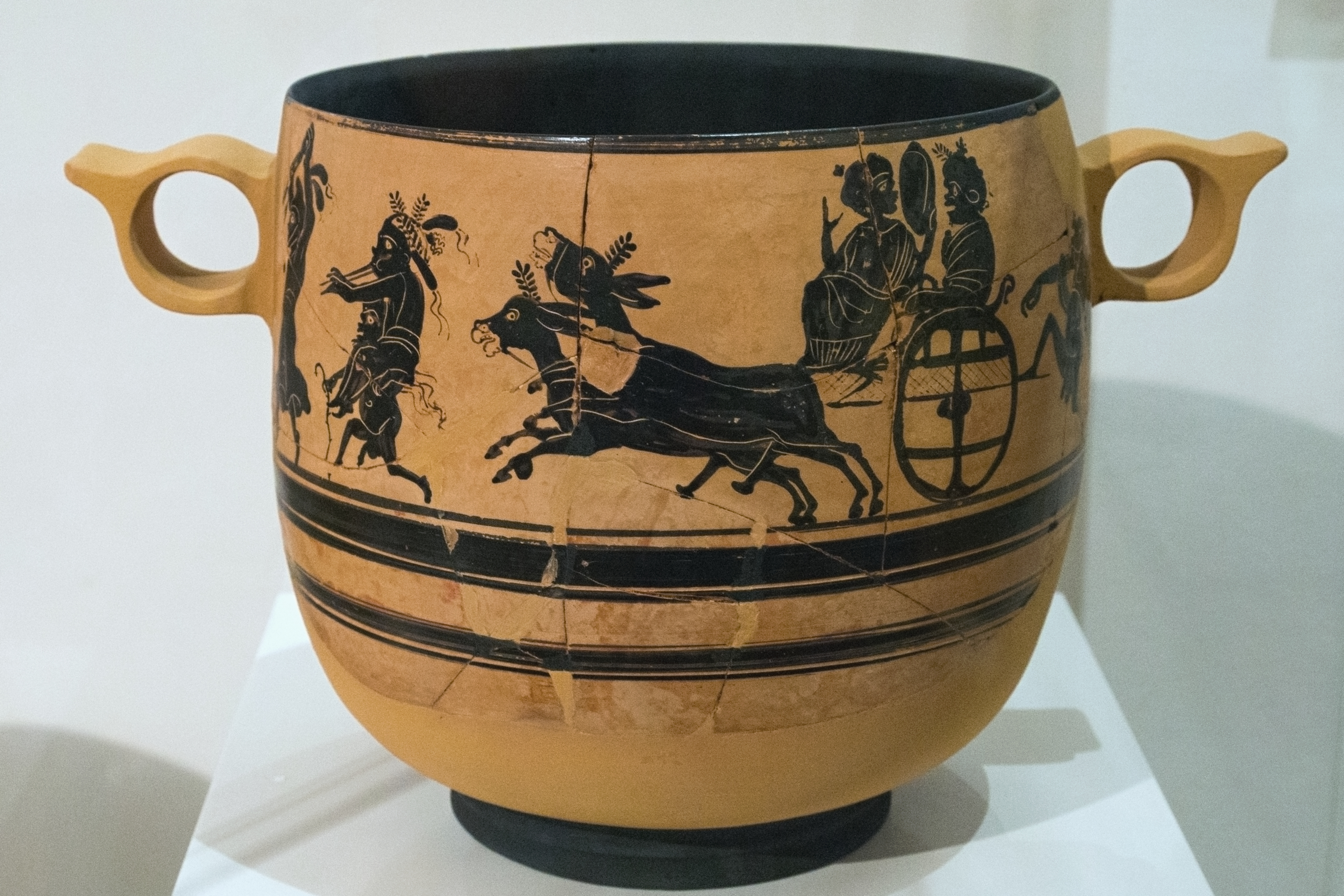
Dwarves are often depicted on Kabeiric pottery from Boeotia

At Thebes in Boeotia, a sanctuary for the Cabeiri existed some miles east of the city. There are more varied finds than on Lemnos; they include many little bronze votive bulls and which carry on into Roman times, when the traveller Pausanias, always alert to the history of cults, learned that it was Demeter Kabeiriia who instigated the initiation cult there in the name of Prometheus and his son Aitnaios. Walter Burkert (1985) writes, "This points to guilds of smiths analogous to the Lemnian Hephaistos." The votive dedications at Thebes are to a Kabeiros (Greek: Κάβειρος) in the singular, and childish toys like votive spinning tops for Pais suggest a manhood initiation. Copious wine was drunk, out of characteristic cups that were ritually smashed. Fat, primitive dwarves (similar to the followers of Silenus) with prominent genitalia were painted on the cups. Thebes is connected to Samothrace in myth, primarily the wedding of Cadmus and Harmonia, which took place there.

== Myth ==
In myth, the Cabeiri bear many similarities to other fabulous races, such as the Telchines of Rhodes, the Cyclopes, the Dactyls, the Korybantes, and the Kuretes. These different groups were often confused or identified with one another since many of them, like the Cyclopes and Telchines, were also associated with metallurgy.

Diodorus Siculus said of the Cabeiri that they were Idaioi dactyloi ("Idaian Dactyls"). The Idaian Dactyls were a race of divine beings associated with the Mother Goddess and with Mount Ida, a mountain in Phrygia sacred to the goddess. Hesychius of Alexandria wrote that the Cabeiri were karkinoi ("crabs"). The Cabeiri as Karkinoi were apparently thought of as amphibious beings (again recalling the Telchines). They had pincers instead of hands, which they used as tongs (Greek: karkina) in metalworking.
