= Hephaestus =

Greek god of blacksmiths

- God of artisans, blacksmiths, carpenters, craftsmen, fire, metallurgy, metalworking, sculpture, and volcanoes
- Member of the twelve Olympians
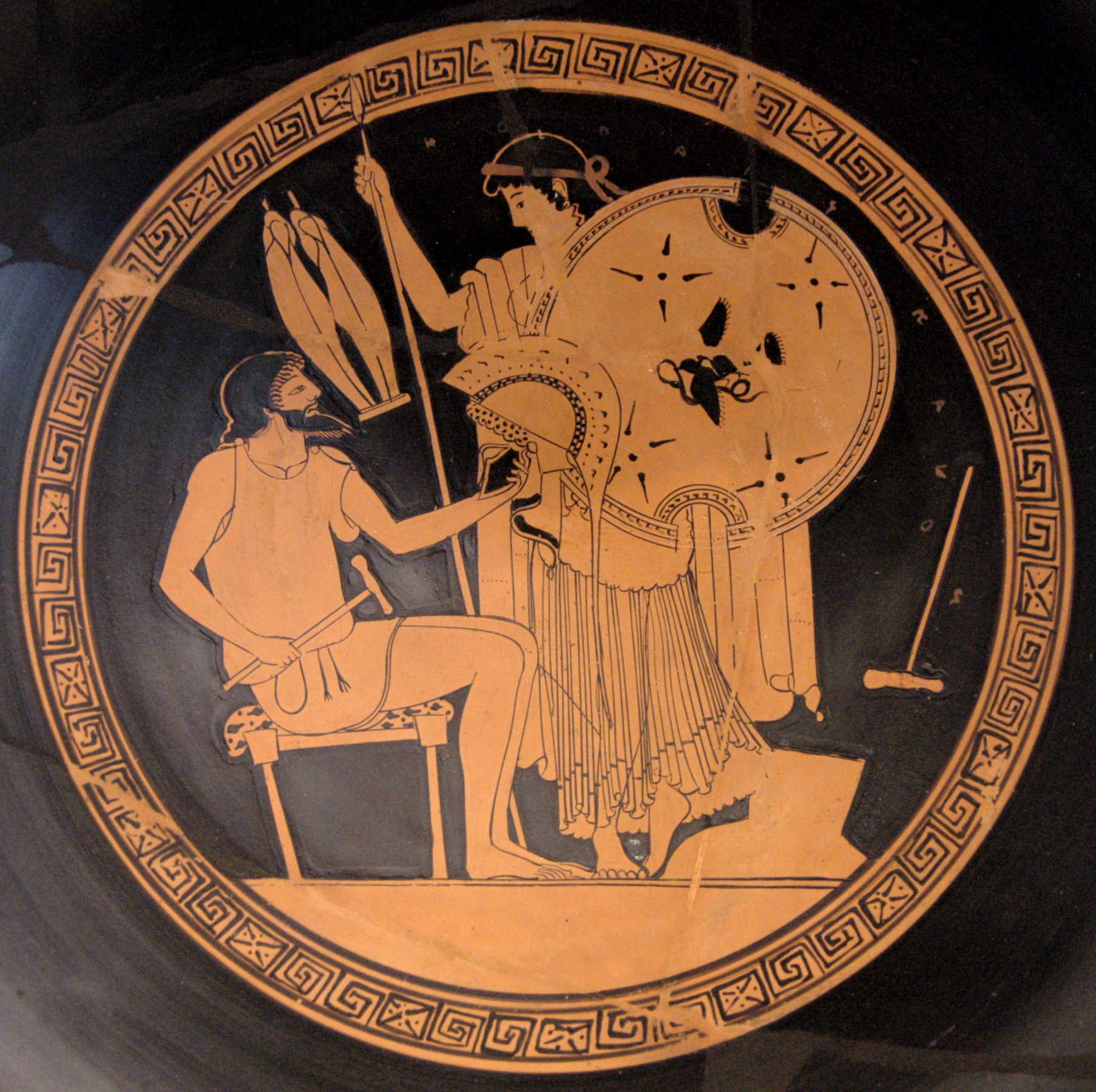
- Hephaestus (left) hands to Thetis the armour of Achilles. Berlin Foundry Cup, an Attic red-figure kylix, c. 500–490 BC
- Abode: Mount Olympus
- Symbol: hammer, anvil, tongs

Genealogy
- Parents: Zeus and Hera, or Hera alone
- Siblings: Ares, Hebe, Eileithyia
- Spouse: Aphrodite (divorced); Charis/Aglaia
- Children: Thalia, Erichthonius, and Cabeiri

Equivalents
- Roman: Vulcan

Hephaestus (UK: /hɪˈfiːstəs/ hih-FEE-stəs, US: /hɪˈfɛstəs/ hih-FES-təs; eight spellings; Ancient Greek: Ἥφαιστος, romanized: Hḗphaistos) is the Greek god of artisans, blacksmiths, carpenters, craftsmen, fire, metallurgy, metalworking, sculpture, and volcanoes. In Greek mythology, Hephaestus was the son of Hera, either on her own or by her husband Zeus. He was cast off Mount Olympus by his mother Hera because of his lameness, the result of a congenital impairment, or in another account, by Zeus for protecting Hera from his advances.

As a smithing god, Hephaestus created all the weapons of the gods in Olympus. He served as the blacksmith of the gods, and was worshipped in the manufacturing and industrial centres of Greece, particularly Athens. The cult of Hephaestus was based in Lemnos. Hephaestus's symbols are a smith's hammer, anvil, and a pair of tongs. In Rome, he was equated with Vulcan.

== Etymology ==
Hephaestus is probably associated with the Linear B (Mycenaean Greek) inscription 𐀀𐀞𐀂𐀴𐀍, A-pa-i-ti-jo, found at Knossos. The inscription indirectly attests his worship at that time because it is believed that it reads the theophoric name (H)āpʰaistios, or Hāphaistion. The Greek theonym Hēphaistos is most likely of Pre-Greek origin, as the form without -i- (Attic Hēphastos) shows a typical Pre-Greek variation and points to an original s^{y}.

== Epithets ==
The epithets by which Hephaestus is known by the poets generally allude to his skill in the plastic arts or to his figure or disability. The Greeks frequently placed miniature statues of Hephaestus near their hearths, and these figures are the oldest of all his representations. The meaning of some of his epithets are:

- Amphigyḗeis often translated as "the lame one"; literally "lame on both sides" vel sim. (Ἀμφιγυήεις)
- Kyllopodíōn "club-footed" or "of dragging feet" (Κυλλοποδίων)
- Khalkeús "coppersmith" (Χαλκεύς)
- Klytotékhnēs "renowned artificer" (Κλυτοτέχνης)
- Polýmētis "shrewd, crafty" or "of many devices" (Πολύμητις)
- Aitnaîos "Aetnaean" (Αἰτναῖος), owing to his workshop supposedly being located below Mount Aetna.
- Polýphrōn "ingenious, inventive" (Πολύφρων)
- Agaklytós "very famous, glorious" (Ἀγακλυτός)
- Aithalóeis theós "sooty god" (Αἰθαλόεις θεός)

== Mythology ==
=== Parentage ===
In Homer's Iliad, Hephaestus is described as the son of Hera; the Iliad seemingly also refers to Zeus as his father at two points, though it is possible these passages are not referring to Hephaestus as Zeus's literal son. The Odyssey does, however, refer explicitly to Hephaestus as having "two parents", the identity of whom would presumably be Zeus and Hera. In Hesiod's Theogony, Hera gives birth to Hephaestus on her own, out of revenge for Zeus having, without her, fathered Athena (the daughter of Zeus and Metis). Apollodorus similarly states that Hera gives birth to Hephaestus alone, though he also relates that, according to Homer, Hephaestus is one of the children of Zeus and Hera.

Some sources state that the origin myth of Hephaestus was that of a "daemon of fire coming up from the Earth"—that he was also associated with gas "which takes fire and burns [and] is considered by many people to be divine" and that only later was a volcano considered Hephaestus's smithy. He was associated by Greek colonists in southern Italy with the volcano gods Adranus (of Mount Etna) and Vulcanus of the Lipari islands. The first-century sage, Apollonius of Tyana, is said to have observed, "there are many other mountains all over the earth that are on fire, and yet we should never be done with it if we assigned to them giants and gods like Hephaestus". Nevertheless, Hephaestus's domain over fire goes back to Homer's Iliad, where he uses flames to dry the waters of Scamandrus River in order to force its eponymous deity, who was attacking Achilles, to retreat. His favourite place in the mortal world was the island of Lemnos, where he liked to dwell among the Sintians, but he also frequented other volcanic islands such as Lipari, Hiera, Imbros and Sicily, which were called his abodes or workshops.

=== Fall from Olympus ===
In one branch of Greek mythology, Hera ejected Hephaestus from the heavens because of his congenital impairment. He fell into the ocean and was raised by Thetis (mother of Achilles and one of the 50 Nereids) and the Oceanid Eurynome.

In another account, Hephaestus, attempting to rescue his mother from Zeus's advances, was flung down from the heavens by Zeus. He fell for an entire day and landed on the island of Lemnos, where he was cared for and taught to be a master craftsman by the Sintians – an ancient tribe native to that island. Later writers describe his physical disability as the consequence of his second fall, while Homer makes him disabled from birth.

=== Return to Olympus ===
Hephaestus was one of the Olympians who returned to Olympus after being exiled.

In an archaic story, (Note: Features within the narrative suggest to Kerenyi and others that it is archaic; the most complete literary account, however, is a late one, in the Roman rhetorician Libanios, according to Hedreen (2004).) Hephaestus gained revenge against Hera for rejecting him by forging her a magical golden throne, which, when she sat on it, did not allow her to stand up again. (Note: A section "The Binding of Hera" is devoted to this archaic theme in Kerenyi (1951, pp 156–158), who refers to this "ancient story", which is one of the "tales of guileful deeds performed by cunning gods, mostly at a time when they had not joined the family on Olympus".) The other gods begged Hephaestus to return to Olympus to let her go, but he refused, saying "I have no mother". It was Ares who undertook the task of fetching Hephaestus at first, but he was threatened by the fire god with torches. At last, Dionysus, the god of wine, fetched him, intoxicated him with wine, and took the subdued smith back to Olympus on the back of a mule accompanied by revelers – a scene that sometimes appears on painted pottery of Attica and of Corinth. According to Hyginus, Zeus promised anything to Hephaestus in order to free Hera. Hephaestus asked for the hand of Athena in marriage (urged by Poseidon, who was hostile toward her), leading to his attempted rape of the goddess, who rejected his advances. In another version, he demanded to be married to Aphrodite in order to release Hera, and his mother fulfilled the request.

The theme of the return of Hephaestus, popular among the Attic vase-painters whose wares were favored among the Etruscans, may have introduced this theme to Etruria. (Note: The return of Hephaestus was painted on the Etruscan tomb at the "Grotta Campana" near Veii was identified by Petersen (1902); the "well-known subject" was doubted in this instance by Harmon (1912).) In the vase-painters' portrayal of the procession, Hephaestus was mounted on a mule or a horse, with Dionysus holding the bridle and carrying Hephaestus's tools (including a double-headed axe). In the painted scenes, the padded dancers and phallic figures of the Dionysan throng leading the mule show that the procession was a part of the dithyrambic celebrations that were the forerunners of the satyr plays of fifth-century Athens. The traveller Pausanias spoke of having seen a painting of Hephaestus in the temple of Dionysus in Athens. The temple had been built in the 5th century, but may have been decorated at any time before the 2nd century CE. When Pausanias saw it, he said:

There are paintings here – Dionysus bringing Hephaestus up to heaven. One of the Greek legends is that Hephaestus, when he was born, was thrown down by Hera. In revenge he sent as a gift a golden chair with invisible fetters. When Hera sat down she was held fast, and Hephaestus refused to listen to any other of the gods except Dionysus – in him he reposed the fullest trust – and after making him drunk Dionysus brought him to heaven.

— Pausanias, 1.20.3

=== Craft of Hephaestus ===
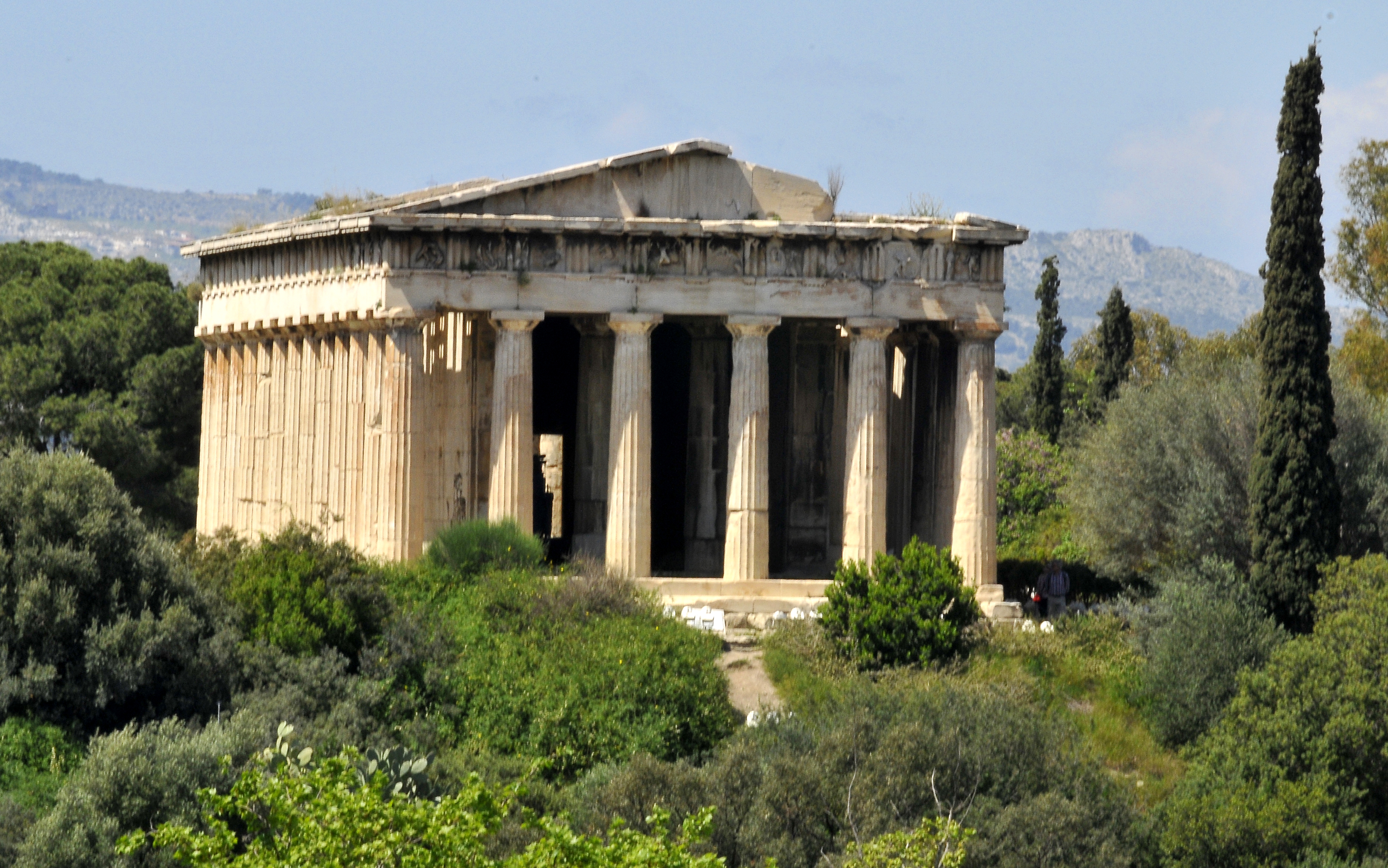
The Doric Temple of Hephaestus, Agora of Athens

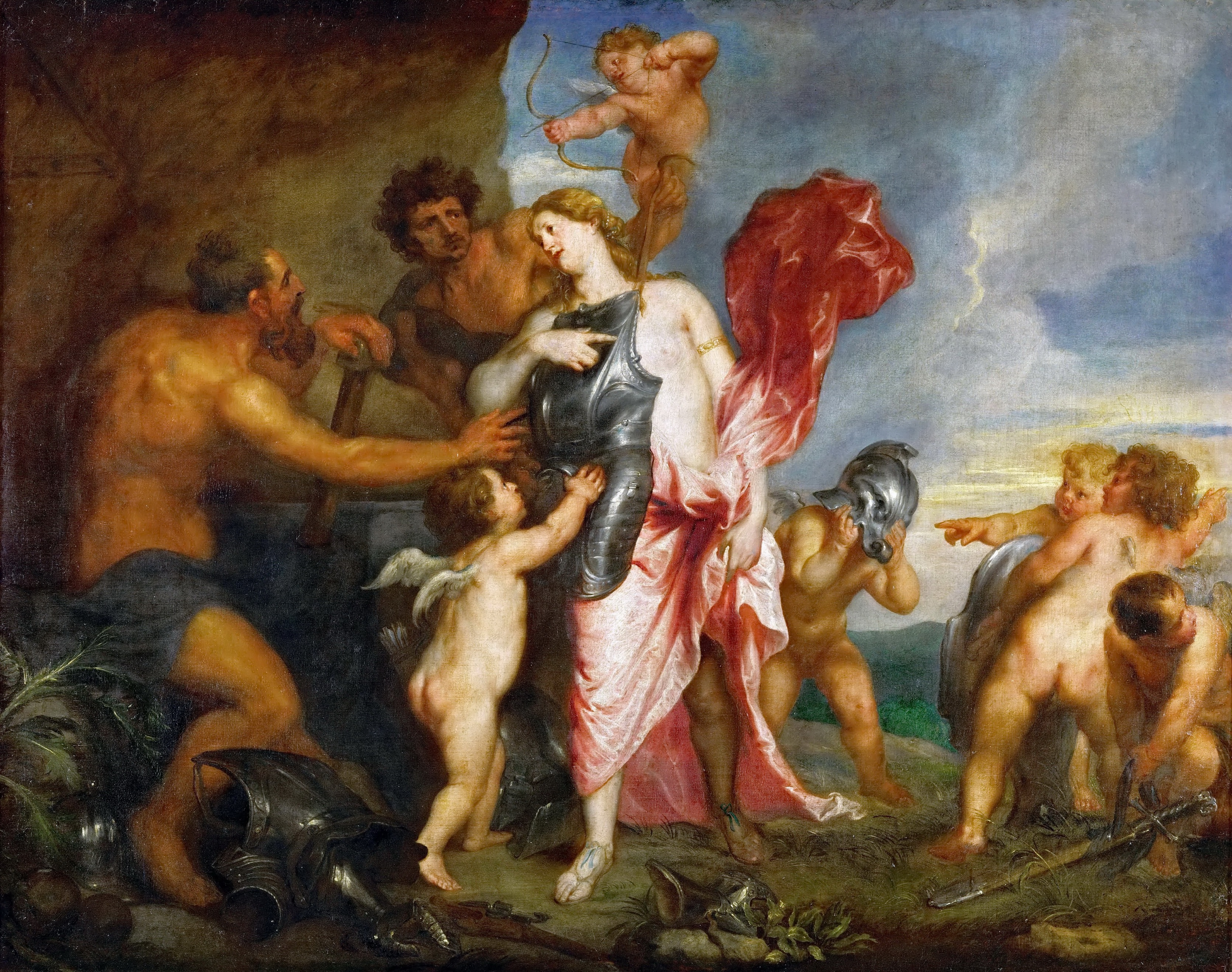
Thetis Receiving the Weapons of Achilles from Hephaestus by Anthony van Dyck (1630–1632)

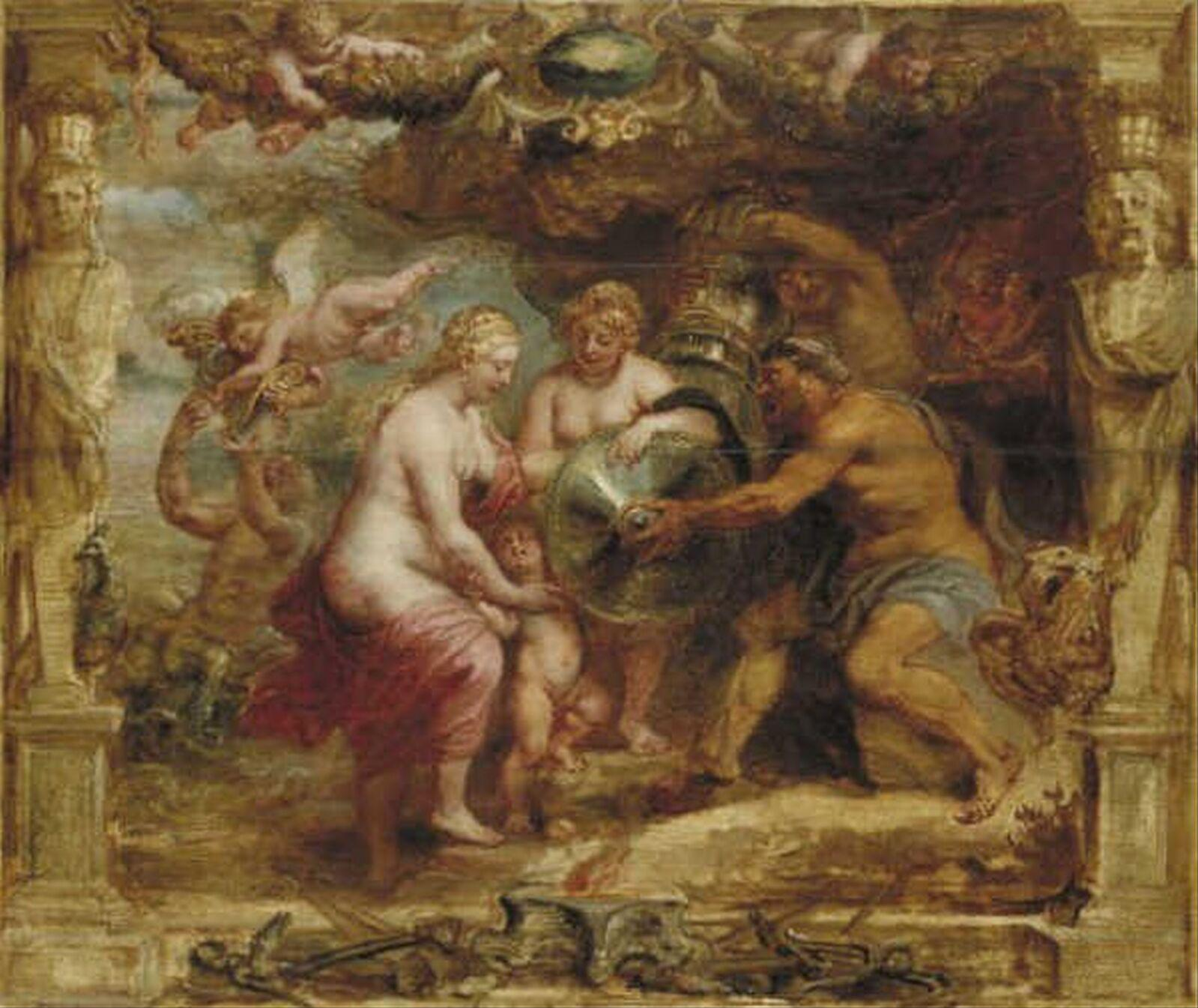
Vulcan Presenting the Arms of Achilles to Thetis by Peter Paul Rubens.

Hephaestus had his own palace on Olympus, containing his workshop with anvil and twenty bellows that worked at his bidding. He crafted much of the magnificent equipment of the gods, and almost any finely wrought metalwork imbued with powers that appears in Greek myth is said to have been forged by Hephaestus. He designed all the thrones in the Palace of Olympus, the Aegis breastplate, Hermes's winged helmet and sandals, Aphrodite's famed girdle, Eros's bow and arrows, Helios's chariot, Heracles's bronze clappers, and the shoulder of Pelops.

Hephaestus also created the gift that the gods gave to mankind: the first woman Pandora and her pithos. In some versions of the myth, Prometheus stole the fire that he gave to man from Hephaestus's forge.

Hephaestus gave to the blinded Orion his apprentice Cedalion as a guide. In later accounts, Hephaestus worked with the Cyclopes Brontes, Steropes and Arges, who were highly skilled blacksmiths in their own right and forged Zeus's thunderbolts, Poseidon's trident and Hades's helmet of darkness.

==== Automatons ====
According to Homer, Hephaestus built automatons of metal to work for him or others. This included tripods with golden wheels, able to move at his wish in and out the assembly hall of the celestials; and "handmaidens wrought of gold in the semblance of living maids", who had "understanding in their hearts, and speech and strength", as a gift of the gods. They moved to support Hephaestus while walking. Hephaestus also put golden and silver lions and dogs at the entrance of the palace of Alkinoos in such a way that they could bite the invaders; these guard dogs did not age nor perish.

A similar golden dog (Κυων Χρυσεος) was set by Rhea to guard the infant Zeus and his nurse, the goat Amaltheia, on the island of Krete. Later Tantalus was said to have stolen the automaton when it guarded Zeus's temple, or to have persuaded Pandareos to steal it for him. Later texts attempt to replace the automaton with the idea that the golden dog was actually Rhea, transformed by Hephaestus.

=== Other myths ===
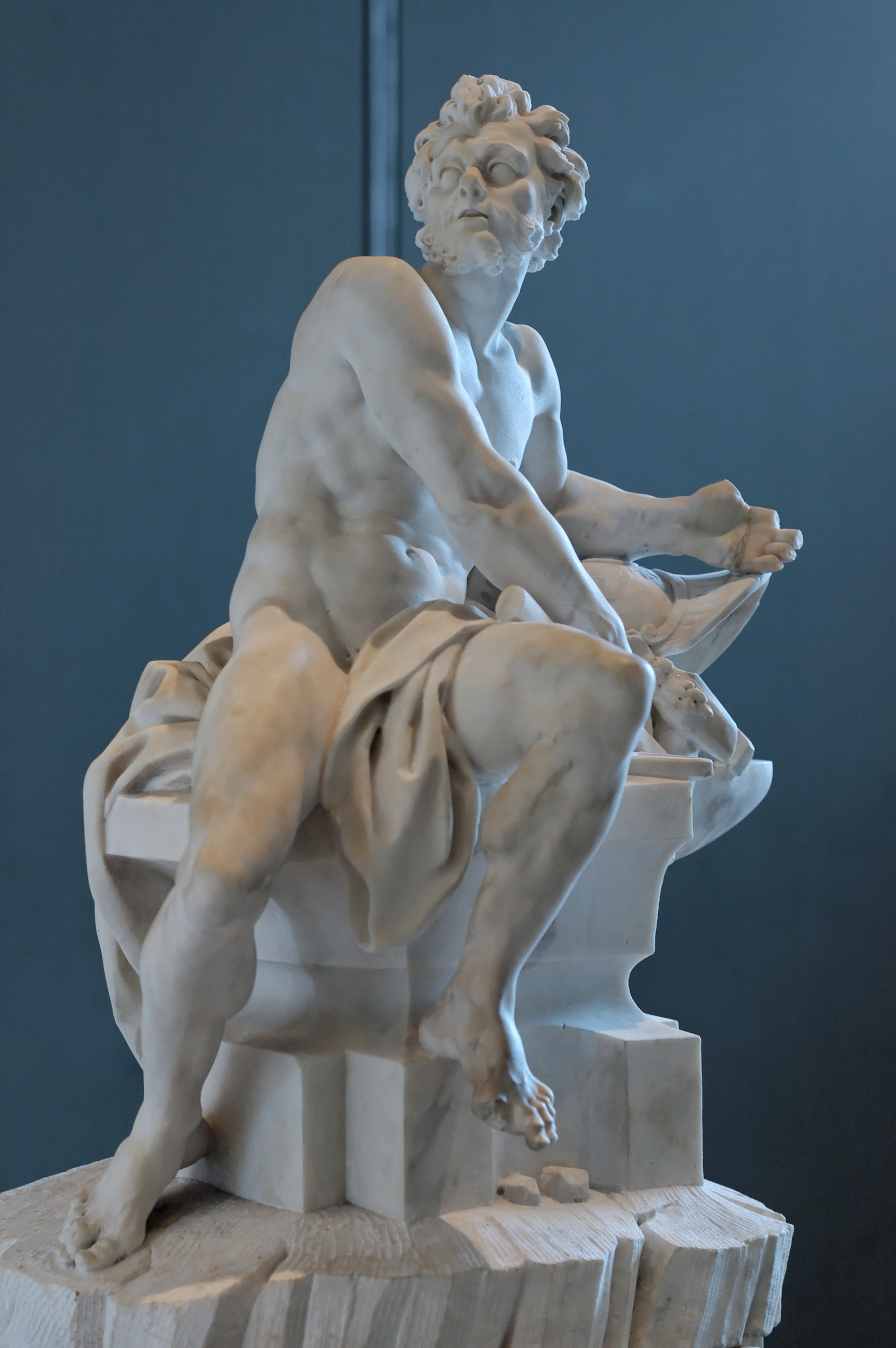
Hephaestus at the Forge by Guillaume Coustou the Younger (Louvre)

Hephaestus fought against the Giants and killed Mimas by throwing molten iron at him. He also fought another Giant, Aristaeus, but he fled. During the battle Hephaestus fell down exhausted, and was picked up by Helios in his chariot. As a gift of gratitude, Hephaestus forged four ever-flowing fountains and fire-breathing bulls for Helios's son Aeëtes.

At the marriage of Peleus and Thetis, Hephaestus gave a knife as a wedding present. When the Trojan War began, Hephaestus sided with the Greeks and forged the armour of Achilles, the cuirass of Diomedes, and Agamemnon's staff of office, but Hephaestus was also worshipped by the Trojans and saved one of their men from being killed by Diomedes.

=== Consorts, victims and children ===
==== Hephaestus and Aphrodite ====
Though married to Hephaestus, Aphrodite had an affair with Ares, the god of war. Eventually, Hephaestus discovered Aphrodite's affair through Helios, the all-seeing Sun, and planned a trap during one of their trysts. While the lovers lay together in bed, Hephaestus ensnared them in an unbreakable chain-link net so small as to be invisible and dragged them to Mount Olympus to shame them in front of the other gods for retribution.

The gods laughed at the sight of these naked lovers, and Poseidon persuaded Hephaestus to free them in return for a guarantee that Ares would pay the adulterer's fine, or that he, Poseidon, would pay it himself. Hephaestus states in The Odyssey that he would return Aphrodite to her father and demand back his bride price. Some versions of the myth state that Zeus did not return the dowry, and in fact Aphrodite "simply charmed her way back again into her husband's good graces." In the Iliad, Hephaestus is described as married to the Grace Charis during the events depicted in the Trojan War, while in the Theogony, he is married to the Grace Aglaea, with no indication of having been ever married to Aphrodite. The later Dionysiaca by Nonnus explicitly states that, though Hephaestus and Aphrodite were once married (she is referred to as his "ancient wife"), that they have since separated and Hephaestus is now married to Charis.

In a much later, interpolated detail, Ares put the young soldier Alectryon by their door to warn them of Helios's arrival as he suspected that Helios would tell Hephaestus of Aphrodite's infidelity if the two were discovered, but Alectryon fell asleep on guard duty. Helios discovered the two and alerted Hephaestus, as Ares, in rage, turned Alectryon into a rooster, which always crows at dawn when the sun is about to rise.

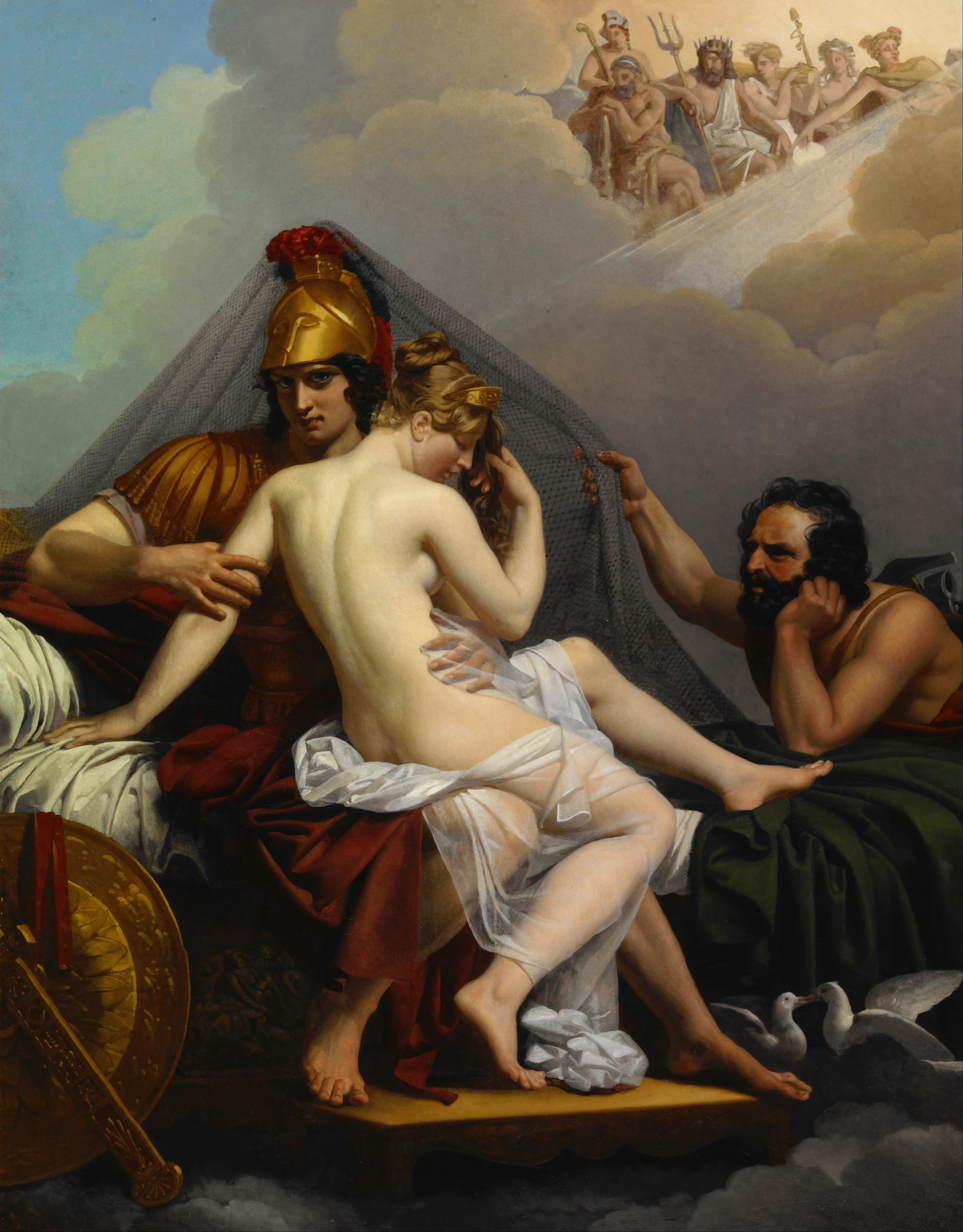
Mars and Venus Surprised by Vulcan by Alexandre Charles Guillemot (1827).

A typical interpretation of why Hephaestus and Aphrodite got married at all is that Hephaestus was promised her hand in marriage so that he would release Hera from the throne; no clear evidence from antiquity of such a version survives however. It is mostly conjectured based on preserved accounts and other testimonies, such as Hyginus' version where Hephaestus asks for Athena to be given as his wife for releasing Hera, and an early sixth-century BC calyx krater, the François Vase, which depicts Hephaestus return to Olympus; Aphrodite looks upset at his arrival, while Ares kneels down looking defeated. It is likely that this narrative, if genuine, originated from the lost Homeric Hymn to Dionysus, which was highly popular during the archaic era. Martin West has identified an echo of Hephaestus and Aphrodite's arranged marriage in Book 14 of the Iliad, where Hera goes to Hephaestus' island Lemnos and promises a golden throne and marriage to Pasithea (a Grace who substitutes Aphrodite) to Hypnos in exchange for a favour.

The Thebans told that the union of Ares and Aphrodite produced Harmonia, but that of the union of Hephaestus with Aphrodite, there was usually no issue. Because Harmonia was conceived during Aphrodite's marriage to Hephaestus, for revenge, on Harmonia's wedding day to Cadmus, Hephaestus gifted her with a finely worked but cursed necklace that brought immense suffering to her descendants, culminating in the story of Oedipus.

The author of Octavia (traditionally attributed to Seneca, but now agreed to not be his) writes that "[we] delude ourselves that [Eros] was born from Venus and sprung from the loins of Vulcan", implying the notion that Eros/Cupid was the son of Vulcan/Hephaestus was a decently common one in late antiquity. Nonnus also seemingly presents Eros as the son of Aphrodite and Hephaestus, but it has been suggested that the use of πολυφράδμων (a word that can mean both 'wise' and 'cunning') to describe Aphrodite and the emphasis given in Hephaestus fearing that Eros would be born crippled like him, only for the child to be able-bodied, strongly implies that Nonnus means for Ares to be understood as the real father, while Aphrodite passed her son as Hephaestus'. Ulrich von Wilamovitz's conjecture of a badly preserved scholium on the Argonautica to read that Ibycus made Eros the son of Aphrodite and Hephaestus is widely accepted by scholars, but cannot be proven as the ancient text is unreadable.

Hephaestus was somehow connected with the archaic, pre-Greek Phrygian and Thracian mystery cult of the Kabeiroi, who were also called the Hephaistoi, "the Hephaestus-men", in Lemnos. One of the three Lemnian tribes also called themselves Hephaestion and claimed direct descent from the god.

==== Hephaestus and Athena ====
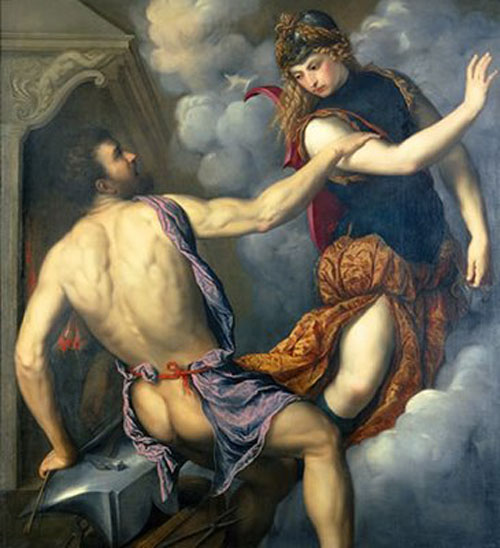
Athena Scorning the Advances of Hephaestus by Paris Bordone (between c. 1555 and c. 1560)

Hephaestus is to the male gods as Athena is to the female goddesses, for he was believed to have taught the mortals crafts and arts alongside Athena. At Athens, they had temples and festivals in common. (Note: See Dict of Ant. s. v. Hêphaisteia, Chalkeia.) Both were believed to have great healing powers, and Lemnian earth (terra Lemnia), from the spot on which Hephaestus had fallen, was believed to cure madness, snakebite and haemorrhage; priests of Hephaestus knew how to cure wounds inflicted by snakes. He was represented in the temple of Athena Chalcioecus (Athena of the Bronze House) at Sparta, in the act of delivering his mother; on the chest of Cypselus, giving Achilles's armor to Thetis; and at Athens there was the famous statue of Hephaestus by Alcamenes, in which his physical disability was only subtly portrayed. He had almost "no cults except in Athens". The Greeks frequently placed miniature statues of Hephaestus near their hearths, and these figures are the oldest of all his representations. In Athens, there is a Temple of Hephaestus, the Hephaesteum (miscalled the "Theseum") near the agora. Athena is sometimes thought to be the "soulmate" of Hephaestus. Nonetheless, Hephaestus "seeks impetuously and passionately to make love to Athena: at the moment of climax she pushes him aside, and his semen falls to the earth where it impregnates Gaia."

An Athenian founding myth tells that the city's patron goddess, Athena, refused a union with Hephaestus. Pseudo-Apollodorus records an archaic legend, which claims that Hephaestus once attempted to rape Athena, but she pushed him away, causing him to ejaculate on her thigh. Athena wiped the semen off using a tuft of wool, which she tossed into the dust, impregnating Gaia and causing her to give birth to Erichthonius, whom Athena adopted as her own child.

The Roman mythographer Hyginus records a similar story in which Hephaestus demanded Zeus to let him marry Athena since he was the one who had smashed open Zeus's skull, allowing Athena to be born. Zeus agreed to this and Hephaestus and Athena were married, but, when Hephaestus was about to consummate the union, Athena vanished from the bridal bed, causing him to ejaculate on the floor, thus impregnating Gaia with Erichthonius. Nonnus refers to this tale of Erechthonius being born of the Earth after a "makeshift marriage", but says that Athena then nursed Erechthonius on her "manlike breast".

==== Others ====
According to most versions, Hephaestus's consort is Aphrodite. However, some sources say that Hephaestus is married to one of the Charites. In Book XVIII of Homer's Iliad, the consort of Hephaestus is Charis, with whom he lives in a bronze-wrought home on Olympus. The same name, Charis, is used later in Lucian's Dialogues of the Gods and Nonnus's Dionysiaca. However, Hesiod names the member of the Charites who is married to Hephaestus as Aglaea, and according to the fifth-century AD Greek Neoplatonist philosopher Proclus, by Hephaestus, Aglaea became the mother of Eucleia, Euthenia, Eupheme, and Philophrosyne. Some scholars conclude that these references refer to the same goddess under different names, although in the Dionysiaca both Aglaea and Charis appear as separate characters (Aglaea refers to Charis as a separate attendant of Aphrodite when speaking to Eros). Károly Kerényi notes that "charis" also means "the delightfulness of art" and supposes that Aphrodite is viewed as a work of art, speculating that Aphrodite could also have been called Charis as an alternative name, for in the Odyssey Homer suddenly makes her his wife.

On the island of Lemnos, however, Hephaestus's consort was the sea nymph Cabeiro, by whom he was the father of two metalworking gods named the Cabeiri. In Sicily, he had another consort, the nymph Aetna, and their sons were two gods of Sicilian geysers called Palici, who are elsewhere called the sons of Zeus by Aetna, or of Zeus by Thalia (another daughter of Hephaestus), or of Adranos.

A Hellenistic poet, Phylarchus, recounted Hephaestus' amorous feelings toward the Nereid Thetis, who once visited him in his forgery to ask from him weapons for her son Achilles, and he agreed on the condition that she would have sex with him. Thetis agreed, and when Hephaestus had completed the weapons she asked to try them on to make sure they would be a fit for him, for she was the same size as Achilles. Now armed, Thetis fled Hephaestus and his advances, and because he could not run and catch her, in anger he wounded her in the ankle with his hammer. Thetis was healed in a Thessalian town that was therefore called Thetidium after her.

Like many male Greek gods, Hephaestus fathered several children with mortals and immortals alike. The following is a list of Hephaestus's offspring, by various mothers. Beside each offspring, the earliest source to record the parentage is given, along with the century to which the source (in some cases approximately) dates.

Offspring	Mother	Source	Date
Eucleia, Euthenia, Eupheme, and Philophrosyne	Aglaea	Proclus	
Erichthonius	Gaia	Hyg. Fab.	1st cent. AD
Erichthonius	Atthis	Apollod.	1st/2nd cent. AD
The Palici	Aetna	Silenos	2nd cent. BC
The Cabeiri, the Cabeirides (nymphs)	Cabeiro	Pherecydes	5th cent. BC
Cadmilus	Cabeiro	Acusilaus	6th/5th cent. BC
Periphetes	Anticlea	Apollodorus	1st/2nd cent. AD
Ardalus	No mother mentioned		
Cercyon	No mother mentioned	Hyg. Fab.	1st cent. AD
Olenus	No mother mentioned	Hyg. De astr.	1st cent. BC/AD
Palaemon	No mother mentioned	Apollod.	1st/2nd cent. AD
Pylius	No mother mentioned	Photios	9th cent. AD
Thalia	No mother mentioned	Aeschylus	5th cent. BC

== Iconography and descriptions ==
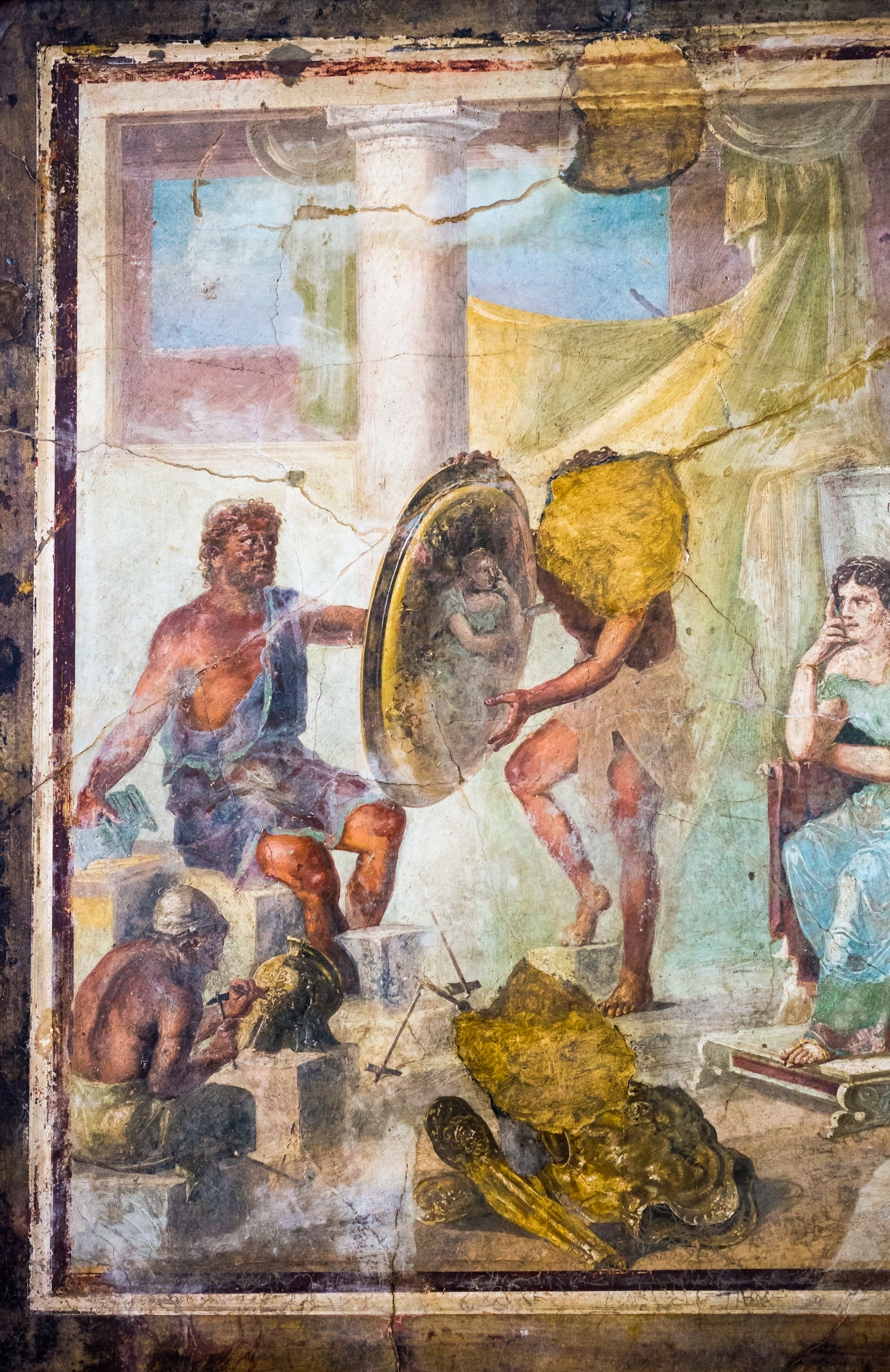
Hephaestus and 2 assistants work on the arms for Achilles, the shield held up by Hephaestus and one of his assistants shows the mirror image of Thetis, sitting and watching the scene. Fresco from Pompeii.

Hephaestus was sometimes portrayed as a vigorous man with a beard and was characterized by his hammer or some other crafting tool, his oval cap, and the chiton.

Hephaestus is described in mythological sources as "lame" (chōlos) and "halting" (ēpedanos). He was depicted with curved feet, an impairment he had either from birth or as a result of his fall from Olympus. In vase paintings, Hephaestus is sometimes shown bent over his anvil, hard at work on a metal creation, and sometimes his feet are curved back-to-front: Hephaistos amphigyēeis. He walked with the aid of a stick. The Argonaut Palaimonius, "son of Hephaestus" (i.e. a bronze-smith), also had a mobility impairment. Other "sons of Hephaestus" were the Cabeiri on the island of Samothrace, who were identified with the crab (karkinos) by the lexicographer Hesychius. The adjective karkinopous ("crab-footed") signified "lame", according to Detienne and Vernant. The Cabeiri were also physically disabled.

In some myths, Hephaestus built himself a "wheeled chair" or chariot with which to move around, thus helping support his mobility while demonstrating his skill to the other gods. In the Iliad 18.371, it is stated that Hephaestus built twenty bronze-wheeled tripods to assist him in moving around.

Hephaestus's appearance and physical disability are taken by some to represent peripheral neuropathy and skin cancer resulting from arsenicosis, caused by arsenic exposure from metalworking. Bronze Age smiths added arsenic to copper to produce harder arsenical bronze, especially during periods of tin scarcity. Many Bronze Age smiths would have suffered from chronic arsenic poisoning as a result of their livelihood. Consequently, the mythic image of the disabled smith is widespread. As Hephaestus was an iron-age smith, not a bronze-age smith, the connection is one from ancient folk memory.

== Comparative mythology ==
Parallels in other mythological systems for Hephaestus's symbolism include:

- The Ugarit craftsman-god Kothar-wa-Khasis, who is identified from afar by his distinctive walk – possibly suggesting that he limps.
- As Herodotus was given to understand, the Egyptian craftsman-god Ptah was a dwarf god and is often depicted naked.
- In Norse mythology, Weyland the Smith was a physically disabled bronzeworker.
- In Hinduism the artificer god Tvastr fills a similar role, albeit more positively portrayed.
- The Ossetian god Kurdalagon may share a similar origin.

== Worship ==
Solinus wrote that the Lycians dedicated a city to Hephaestus and called it Hephaestia.

The Hephaestia in Lemnos was named after the god. In addition, the whole island of Lemnos was sacred to Hephaestus.

Pausanias wrote that the Lycians in Patara had a bronze bowl in their temple of Apollo, saying that Telephus dedicated it and Hephaestus made it.

Pausanias also wrote that the village of Olympia in Elis contained an altar to the river Alpheios, next to which was an altar to Hephaestus sometimes referred to as the altar of "Warlike Zeus."

The island Thermessa, between Lipari and Sicily, was also called Hiera of Hephaestus (ἱερὰ Ἡφαίστου), meaning "sacred place of Hephaestus" in Greek.

== Namesakes ==
Pliny the Elder wrote that at Corycus, there was a stone which was called Hephaestitis or "Hephaestus stone". According to Pliny, the stone was red and reflected images like a mirror, and when boiling water was poured over it, it cooled immediately. Alternatively, when placed in the sun, it immediately set fire to a parched substance.

The minor planet 2212 Hephaistos, discovered in 1978 by Soviet astronomer Lyudmila Chernykh, was named in Hephaestus's honour.

The protein hephaestin has a role in oxidising iron absorbed by intestinal cells to facilitate its transport.

== Genealogy ==
Hephaestus's family tree

Gaia
Uranus
Uranus's genitals	Coeus	Phoebe	Cronus	Rhea
Leto	Zeus	Hera	Poseidon	Hades	Demeter	Hestia
Apollo	Artemis	a
b
Ares	HEPHAESTUS
Metis
Athena
Maia
Hermes
Semele
Dionysus
Dione
a	b
Aphrodite

== See also ==
- Family tree of the Greek gods
- Hephaestus in popular culture
- Penshaw Monument

== Bibliography ==
=== Ancient ===
- Apollodorus, Apollodorus, The Library, with an English Translation by Sir James George Frazer, F.B.A., F.R.S. in 2 Volumes. Cambridge, MA, Harvard University Press; London, William Heinemann Ltd. 1921. Online version at the Perseus Digital Library.
- Apollonius of Rhodes, Argonautica; with an English translation by R. C. Seaton. William Heinemann, 1912.
- Bernabé, Alberto (2004), Poetae epici Graeci: Testimonia et fragmenta, Pars II: Orphicorum et Orphicis similium testimonia, Fasc 1, Bibliotheca Teubneriana, Munich and Leipzig, K. G. Saur Verlag, 2004. ISBN 978-3-598-71707-9. Online version at De Gruyter.
- Evelyn-White, Hugh, The Homeric Hymns and Homerica with an English Translation by Hugh G. Evelyn-White. Homeric Hymns. Cambridge, Massachusetts, Harvard
- Hesiod, Theogony, in The Homeric Hymns and Homerica with an English Translation by Hugh G. Evelyn-White, Cambridge, MA., Harvard University Press; London, William Heinemann Ltd. 1914. Online version at the Perseus Digital Library.
- Homer, The Iliad with an English Translation by A.T. Murray, PhD in two volumes. Cambridge, MA., Harvard University Press; London, William Heinemann, Ltd. 1924. Online version at the Perseus Digital Library.
- Homer; The Odyssey with an English Translation by A.T. Murray, PH.D. in two volumes. Cambridge, MA., Harvard University Press; London, William Heinemann, Ltd. 1919. Online version at the Perseus Digital Library.
- Hyginus, De astronomia, in The Myths of Hyginus, edited and translated by Mary A. Grant, Lawrence: University of Kansas Press, 1960. Online version at ToposText.
- Hyginus, Fabulae, in The Myths of Hyginus, edited and translated by Mary A. Grant, Lawrence: University of Kansas Press, 1960. Online version at ToposText.
- Nonnus, Dionysiaca; translated by Rouse, W H D, I Books I-XV. Loeb Classical Library No. 344, Cambridge, Massachusetts, Harvard University Press; London, William Heinemann Ltd. 1940. Internet Archive
- Nonnus, Dionysiaca; translated by Rouse, W H D, II Books XVI-XXXV. Loeb Classical Library No. 345, Cambridge, Massachusetts, Harvard University Press; London, William Heinemann Ltd. 1940. Internet Archive
- Kern, Otto, Orphicorum Fragmenta, Berlin, 1922. Internet Archive.
- Ovid, Ovid's Fasti: With an English translation by Sir James George Frazer, London: W. Heinemann LTD; Cambridge, Massachusetts, Harvard University Press, 1959. Internet Archive.
- Pausanias, Pausanias Description of Greece with an English Translation by W.H.S. Jones, Litt.D., and H.A. Ormerod, M.A., in 4 Volumes. Cambridge, MA, Harvard University Press; London, William Heinemann Ltd. 1918. Online version at the Perseus Digital Library.
- Seneca, Octavia, with an English translation by W. Bradshaw, London. 1902. Online version at Attalus.org.
- Strabo, The Geography of Strabo. Edition by H.L. Jones. Cambridge, Mass.: Harvard University Press; London: William Heinemann, Ltd. 1924. Online version at the Perseus Digital Library.

=== Modern ===
- Beekes, Robert S. P. (2009). Etymological Dictionary of Greek. Brill. ISBN 978-90-04-32186-1.
- Gantz, Timothy, Early Greek Myth: A Guide to Literary and Artistic Sources, Johns Hopkins University Press, 1996, Two volumes: ISBN 978-0-8018-5360-9 (Vol. 1), ISBN 978-0-8018-5362-3 (Vol. 2).
- Grimal, Pierre, The Dictionary of Classical Mythology, Wiley-Blackwell, 1996. ISBN 978-0-631-20102-1. Internet Archive.
- Hard, Robin, The Routledge Handbook of Greek Mythology: Based on H.J. Rose's "Handbook of Greek Mythology", Psychology Press, 2004. ISBN 978-0-415-18636-0. Google Books.
- Kerényi, Karl (1951). The Gods of the Greeks. London: Thames and Hudson. ISBN 0-500-27048-1.
- Smith, William, Dictionary of Greek and Roman Biography and Mythology, London (1873). Online version at the Perseus Digital Library.
- Slater, Philip Elliot (1968), The Glory of Hera: Greek Mythology and the Greek Family, Princeton, New Jersey: Princeton University Press, ISBN 0-691-00222-3
- Stein, Murray, Soul: Treatment and Recovery: The selected works of Murray Stein, Routledge, 2015. ISBN 9781317649847.
- Strabo, Geography, translated by Horace Leonard Jones; Cambridge, Massachusetts: Harvard University Press; London: William Heinemann, Ltd. (1924). LacusCurtis, Online version at the Perseus Digital Library, Books 6–14.
- Tripp, Edward, Crowell's Handbook of Classical Mythology, New York, Thomas Y. Crowell, 1970. ISBN 069022608X. Internet Archive.
- West, M. L. (1983), The Orphic Poems, Clarendon Press Oxford, 1983. ISBN 978-0-19-814854-8.
- West, Martin L. (June 2011). "The First Homeric Hymn to Dionysus". In Faulkner, Andrew (ed.). The Homeric Hymns: Interpretative Essays. Oxford Academic. pp. 29–43. doi:10.1093/acprof:oso/9780199589036.003.0002. ISBN 9780199589036.
- Witczak K. T., Zawiasa D. (2004). "Palici – the Sicilian Twin Brothers and the Indo- European Myth about Divine Twins". In: Živa Antika [Antiquité Vivante] 54(1–2), 2004.
