= Monastero di Santa Lucia (Adrano) =

Coordinates: 37.66284°N 14.83360°E

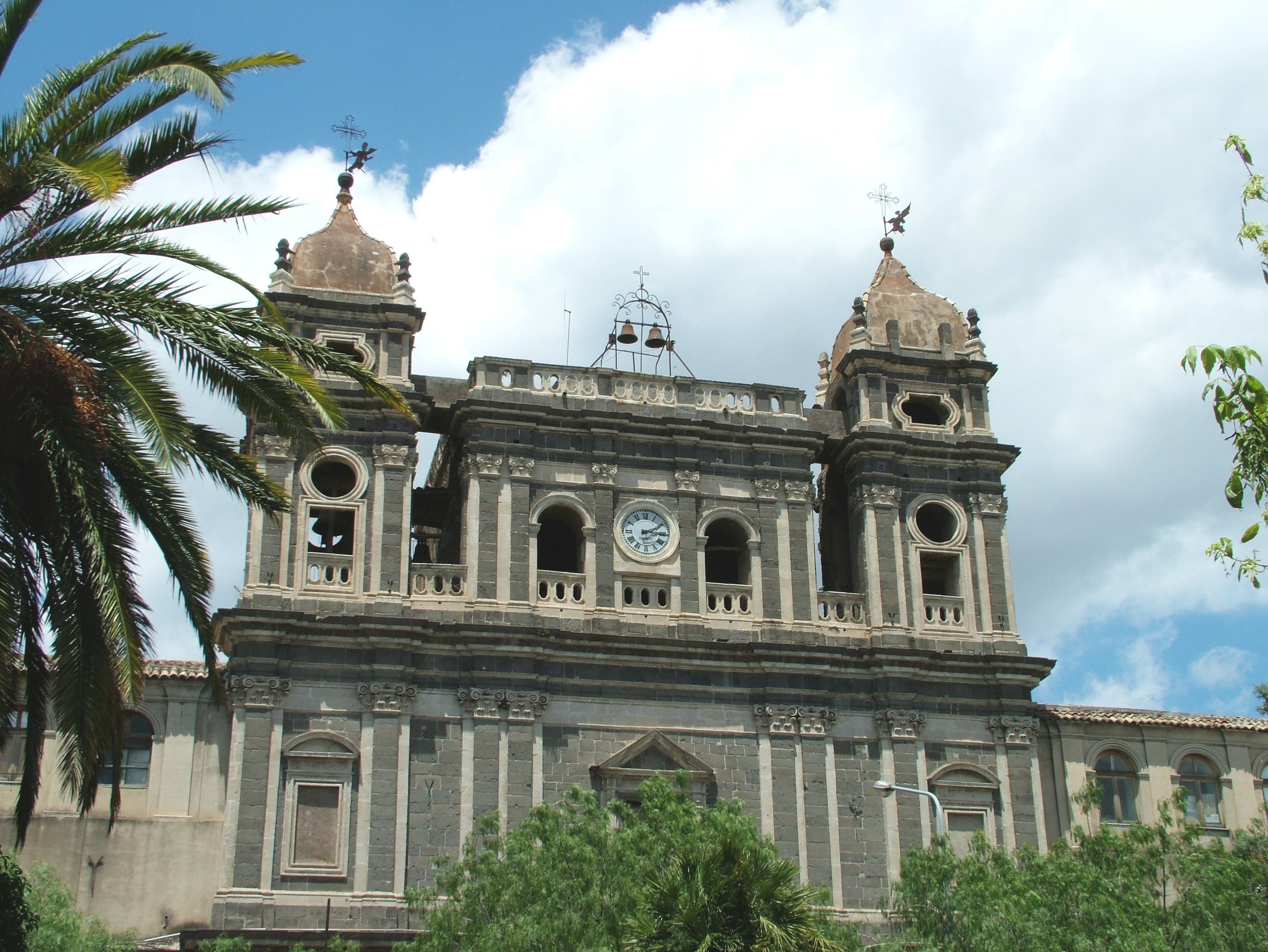
Monastero di Santa Lucia

Monastero di Santa Lucia (Monastery of Saint Lucy) is an architectural complex in the town of Adrano, in the Province of Catania, region of Sicily, Italy. The former Benedictine monastery currently serves as an elementary school, and attached to it is the Giovanni Verga high school. In front of the facade is a polygonal public park known as either Giardino della Vittoria or Villa Comunale.

The monastery of Santa Lucia was founded in 1157 by Adelasia, the granddaughter of the Norman Count Ruggero. Her endowment allowed poor young girls to enter the monastery without requiring a dowry for sustenance. The monastery owned surrounding farmlands. At the time, this was located outside the medieval city walls, near the church of the Madonna della Consolazione. The monastery was expanded in 1596, but much was rebuilt, including the central baroque church in the late 18th century. The façade has three orders. Two bell towers rise on the sides with quadrangular domes.The design of the church is attributed to Stefano Ittar.

Inside, the interior was composed of a single elliptical nave with a dome. A painting depicting Saint Lucy (1843) is attributed to Giuseppe Rapisardi. The apse paintings, the decorations of the vault, and the paintings on the first altar on the left and on the second altar on the right are attributed to the school of Olivio Sozzi. The paintings in the dome, framed by elegant stuccoes, depict the Assumption of the Virgin and are attributed to Vito D'Anna. In the spandrels, are depicted the four doctors of the church. The apse depict the four evangelists and the Transfiguration of Christ.

== Bibliography ==
- Autoführer-Verlag, Baedekers (1962). Italy, including Sicily and Sardinia. K. Baedeker.
- Encyclopædia Britannica, Inc (1998). The New Encyclopædia Britannica. Encyclopædia Britannica.
- Michelin (2009). Sicily. Michelin Tyre.
- Scalisi, Lina, Obbedientissime ad ogni ordine. Tra disciplina e trasgressione: il monastero di Santa Lucia in Adrano secoli XVI-XVIII, Editore Sanfilippo. Catania 1998.
