= Lucius Coelius Antipater =

Lucius Coelius Antipater was a Roman jurist and historian. He is not to be confused with Coelius Sabinus, the "Coelius" of the Digest. The well-known orator, Lucius Licinius Crassus, was his pupil, and Coelius was a contemporary of C. Gracchus.

== Style ==
Coelius was the first who endeavoured to impart to Roman history the ornaments of style, and to make it more than a mere chronicle of events, but his diction was rather vehement and high-sounding than elegant and polished. Pomponius considers him more an orator than a jurist; Cicero, on the other hand, prizes him more as a jurist than as an orator or historian.

== Writings ==
None of his juridical writings have been preserved. He wrote a history of the Second Punic War, and composed annals, which were epitomized by Brutus.

Antipater followed the Greek history of Silenus Calatinus, and occasionally borrowed from the Origines of Cato the Elder. He is occasionally quoted by Livy, who sometimes, with respectful consideration, dissents from his authority. It is manifest, however, from Cicero and Valerius Maximus that he was fond of relating dreams and portents.

== Editions ==
Orelli refers to the dissertations on Antipater by Bavius Antius Nauta and G. Groen van Prinsterer, inserted in the Annals of the Academy of Leyderi for 1821. His fragments, several of which are preserved by Nonius Marcellus, are to be found appended to editions of Sallust by Joseph Wasse, Corte, and Havercamp; and also in Krause's Vitae et Fragmenta vet. Histor, Mom. p. 182, etc.

== Reception ==
Hadrian is reported to have preferred him as an historian to Sallust (Historia Augusta, Hadrian, c. 16); by Valerius Maximus he is designated "certus Romanae historiae auctor" (a reliable authority on Roman history).
