= Nicolò Politi =

Italian Roman Catholic saint

Saint Nicolò Politi

Hermit
- Born: 1117; Adrano, County of Sicily
- Died: 17 August 1167 (aged 49); Alcara li Fusi, Kingdom of Sicily
- Venerated in: Roman Catholic Church
- Canonized: 7 June 1507, Old Saint Peter's Basilica, Rome, Papal States by Pope Julius II
- Feast: 17 August
- Attributes: Staff
- Patronage: Adrano; Alcara li Fusi

Nicolò Politi (3 August 1117 - 17 August 1167) was an Italian Roman Catholic monk and hermit who joined the Basilians. Politi was born to nobles but fled to become a monk after his parents arranged his marriage when he was seventeen. He spent the next several decades in a mountain cave and would return to the Basilian convent each weekend for the sacraments before he returned to his cave. He was known for his miracles since his childhood and was venerated as a saint after his death despite his reclusive hermitage.

He was canonized as a saint on 7 June 1507.

== Life ==
Nicolò Politi was born in Adrano on 6 September 1117 as the sole child born to aged parents (Almidoro and Alpina) who were nobles. He received a secular and religious education befitting for a noble and was known for his piousness and his desire to often contemplate on the Passion of Jesus Christ. But Politi was drawn to the consecrated life and wanted to live a life for God alone; his parents decided to arrange his marriage when he turned seventeen in order to further bolster their house's fortunes more so since Politi was the last chance for their lineage to continue.

It is said that on 1 December 1116 his parents traveled to Alcara li Fusi to participate in the festivities to be held on 6 December to honor Bishop Nicholas; the couple begged for his intercession to have a child and promised to name their child in the saint's honor. In his childhood his teacher Andrea was amazed at how fast he learnt Greek and Latin.

But this marriage provoked a crisis in the adolescent since it clashed with his dream to live a life for God. He fled before the planned wedding and decided to enter a convent to become a monk. It is said that an angel helped him flee the night before the wedding and would return when his parents sent guards to search for him at certain times (he was hiding just outside Etna at the time). Politi later encountered the Basilian monk Lorenzo Ravi da Frazzanò who directed him to the convent (the two would become close friends). He became a Basilian monk after entering their Santa Maria del Rogato convent before he decided to take up his hermitage on Mount Calanna. Politi lived a life of severe asceticism and ventured out of his cave each weekend to return to the convent to receive the Eucharist and to make his confession. In 1162 he met with his old friend Lorenzo and showed him his cave; his friend expressed disbelief at Politi's living conditions but the two meditated together on the Passion and dined on herbs and bread. But Lorenzo told Politi that he had a revelation that he would die on 30 December; on that date he knew his friend died when he smelt roses in his cave.

Politi became renowned throughout his life for miracles that were recorded since his childhood. These cases include:

- The water used to wash him at birth was thrown but a spring would continue to gush water from the spot where it hit the ground.
- As a newborn he refused to eat at certain times that began his lifelong fasting habits.
- Used the sign of the Cross to repel wolves from attacking sheep.
- Once struck a rock with his staff to receive water.
- Once encountered the Devil who attempted to tempt him into secular pleasures; Politi rebuked him and forced the Devil to leave when he affirmed his faith and obedience in God.

Politi knew his end was near when the angel appeared to him to warn him about his imminent death. The angel appeared after Politi returned to his cave on 12 August 1167 in a state of exhaustion. The angel said that he would die soon after the feast of the Assumption. This allowed for the hermit to go to the convent on 15 August to receive the Eucharist and make his confession for the last time. He died at dawn on 17 August 1167 holding a crucifix.

== Canonization ==
His reputation for holiness and his miracles led to Pope Julius II canonizing Politi as a saint on 7 June 1507 in Rome.
