= Cabeiro =

Daughter of Proteus in Greek mythology

In Greek mythology, Cabeiro (or Kabeiro) was a daughter of the shape-shifting marine god Proteus. After being thrown out of Mount Olympus, the Greek forge god Hephaestus fathered three sons known as the Cabeiri and the three Cabeirian nymphs with her.
