= Palici =

Pair of Sicilian chthonic deities

The Palici (Ancient Greek: Παλικοί, romanized: Palikoi, singular Palicus (Παλικός)), or Palaci, were a pair of indigenous Sicilian chthonic deities in Roman mythology, and to a lesser extent in Greek mythology. They are mentioned in Ovid's Metamorphoses V, 406, and in Virgil's Aeneid IX, 585. Their cult centered on three small lakes that emitted sulphurous vapors in the Palagonia plain, and as a result these twin brothers were associated with geysers and the underworld. There was also a shrine to the Palici in Palacia, where people could subject themselves or others to tests of reliability through divine judgement; passing meant that an oath could be trusted.

== Genealogy ==
The mythological lineage of the Palici is uncertain. One version of the legend attributes their parentage to sky god Zeus and nymph Aetna. Others associate their birth to a coupling between Aetna herself and smith deity Hephaestus. The "Greek version" indicate they are sons of Zeus and another nymph, called Thaleia. A third account claimed that the Palici were the sons of the Sicilian deity Adranus.

The medieval Vatican Mythographers book ascribed their lineage to Zeus and Aetna: Zeus (Jupiter) impregnated Aetna and she, fearing the wrath of Hera (Juno), was entrusted to Earth to protect her and her sons.

== Interpretations ==
The second book of the Vatican Mythographers translated their name as 'twice-born'.

Scholar Marcel Meulder argues for a Proto-Indo-European origin for their name, and relates it to a group of Greek compound names that belong to the semantic field of colours (e.g., leuko 'white'; melas 'black'). Thus, their name would mean 'of a white colour, of a grey colour, of a yellow colour' ("blanchâtre, jaunâtre, grisâtre”"). He also suggests it as evidence of the Indo-European character of the Siculian language.

Polish historian Krzysztof Tomasz Witczak and Daria Zawiasa suggest the Palici may derive from the old Indo-European mytheme of the divine twins. They argue that the pair fit some of the common traits that scholar Donald J. Ward ascribed to the mytheme, such as a sky-god's paternity and a single designation for both twins.
