= Ponte dei Saraceni, Adrano =

Italian bridge

Coordinates: 37.70091°N 14.79977°E

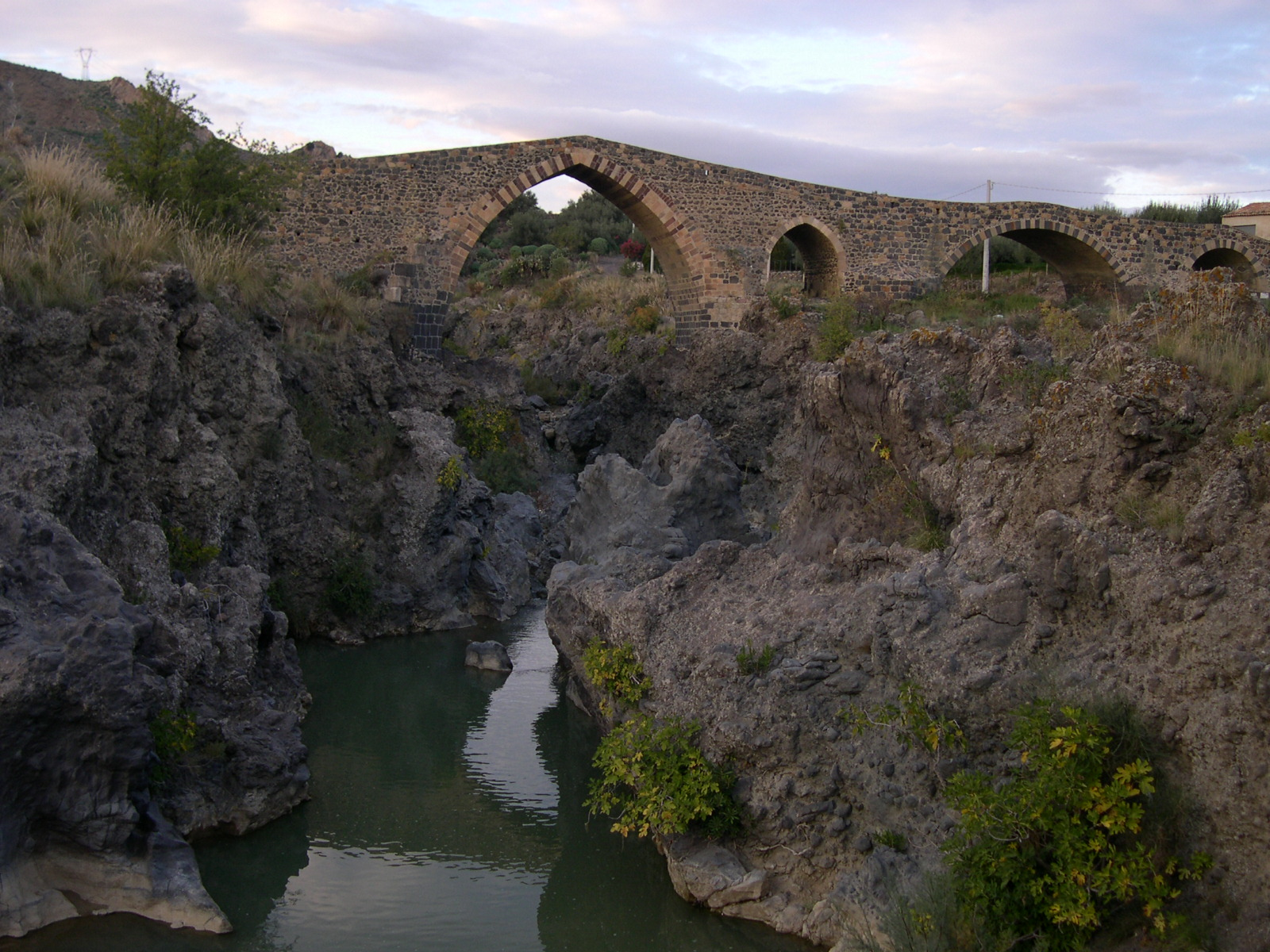
Ponte dei Saraceni

The Ponte dei Saraceni is an ancient stone and brick bridge, presumably originally built by the Ancient Romans, over the river Simeto in Adrano, region of Sicily, Italy.

While the base of the bridge at parts is likely of the original Roman construction, it was apparently rebuilt during the Norman conquest, leading to the arch framed in stones of alternating colors and creating an acute angle arch. Further damage occurred during the 1693 Sicily earthquake, leading again to reconstruction, but by the end of the 18th-century, the bridge was downgraded to a pedestrian trail, while the Biscari aqueduct bridge (begun in 1761 and completed in 1791) replaced the function of being the connection to Catania form Northwest Sicily. The smaller arches of the bridge differ in sizes and angle, are reconstructions done after a flood in 1948. Upstream of the river (or stream) the water has made grooves into the volcanic lava.
