= Giuseppe Guzzardi =

Italian painter (1845–1914)

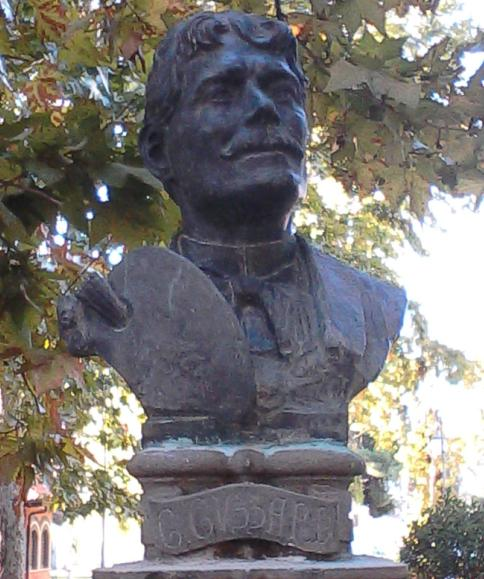
Portrait bust of Guzzardi by his pupil Angelo La Naia

Giuseppe Guzzardi (December 8, 1845 – September 14, 1914) was an Italian painter.

== Biography ==
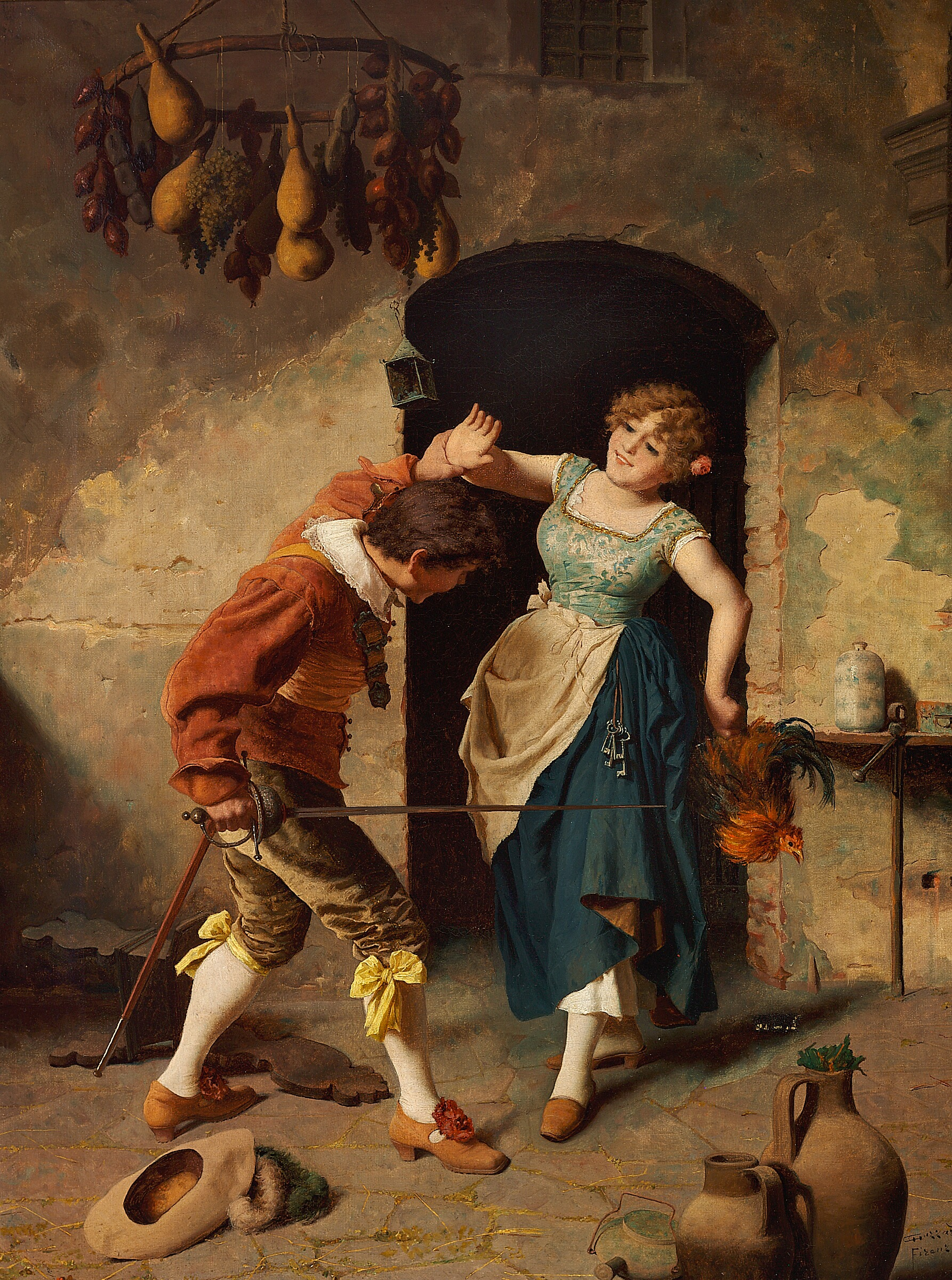
Genre painting of Kitchen interior with playful young couple

Guzzardi was born in Adernò, now called Adrano. He first trained as a child with a local painter, Vincenzo Costa. His early work showed such promise that the comune awarded him a stipend to study in Florence, where he studied at the Academy of Fine Arts under Antonio Ciseri.

In 1874, he first exhibited at the Florentine Promotrice. In 1876 at the Academy in Florence, he exhibited The Virgin on Golgotha (now in Sanctuary of Maria SS. Ausiliatrice of Adrano). In 1876 he exhibited at the Florentine Promotrice Rural Idyll, which the Artistic Fellowship selected to be copied for distribution to its members. He was also in demand as a portraitist.

In the 1880s, Guzzardi was named honorary professor at the Academy in Florence. He returned to his hometown of Adrano in 1887, to bring help during a cholera epidemic. After the epidemic, he returned to Tuscany and painted landscapes of Sicily, including Turiddu and Carminuzza, exhibited in 1887 at the Florentine Promotrice, and was awarded a gold medal at the International Exposition in Cologne in 1889.

In 1900, he painted a Jesus appears to the Blessed Margaret Mary Alacoque and in 1902, the Repentance of Mary Magdalene for the Chiesa Madre, Adrano.

Guzzardi died in Florence on September 14, 1914.
