= Adranus =

Ancient Sicilian fire god

- God of fire, probably war
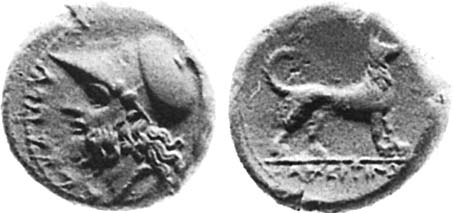
- Coin with the god and one of his sacred dogs
- Symbol: Spear, dog

Genealogy
- Spouse: Thalia
- Children: Palici

Equivalents
- Greek: Hephaestus

Adranus or Adranos (Ancient Greek: Ἀδρανός) was a fire god worshipped by the Sicels, an ancient population of the island of Sicily. His worship occurred all over the island, but particularly in the town of Adranus (modern Adrano) near Mount Etna. According to Aelian, about a thousand sacred dogs were kept near his temple in this town.

Adranus was said to have lived under Mount Etna before being driven out by the Greek god Hephaestus, or Vulcan. According to Hesychius, Adranus was the father of the Palici, born to Adranus's lover, the nymph Thalia.

Some modern commentators have suggested that Adranus may have been related to the similarly named gods Adar and Adrammelech, from Persia and Phoenicia respectively, who were also personifications of the sun or of fire in general.
