= Angelo La Naia =

Italian painter (1884–1968)

Angelo La Naia (November 14, 1884 – 16 June 1968) was an Italian painter.

== Biography ==
La Naia was born in Adrano, in Sicily to a family of limited means living off farming. As a young man, he was encouraged to pursue painting by Nicolò Lauricella and Giuseppe Guzzardi. He was a pupil for a time under Guzzardi, and at a local school of art. He moved to Florence. There he was to live with two orphan sisters; one of them, Emilia Bellati, would inspire many of his works. He would marry her only on 14 June 1968, two days before his death.

He was made instructor of design at the Accademia delle Belle Arti di Firenze of Florence. During his productive career, he pursued both painting, sculpture and architecture. Among his works are:

- Funeral Monument to mother Maria Rosa Costanzo and cousin Neri Nicolò
- Bronze bust of Giuseppe Guzzardi in Giardino della Vittoria, Adrano
- Bronze bust of Lieutenant Alì in Giardino della Vittoria
- Monumento ai caduti nella guerra 1915/18 (Monument to fallen in World War I), once in Giardino della Vittoria, now in piazza A. Diaz.
- Portraits of Giordano Bruno, Mario Rapisardi, Garibaldi, Vittorio Emananuele II, Cavour e Mazzini.
- Apparition of the Angel to San Nicolò Politi (1924-1927) in Chiesa Madre, Adrano
- San Nicolò entra nella grotta dell'Aspicuddu (1924-1927) also in Chiesa Madre, Adrano
- San Nicolò orante davanti alla grotta dell'Aspicuddu (1924-1927) in Sant'Agostino, Adrano
- Apotheosis of Santa Teresa del Bambin Gesù for Chiesa del Rosario, Adrano
