= Aetna (nymph) =

Ancient Greek mythological figure

Aetna (Ancient Greek: Αἴτνη, romanized: Aítnē) was in Greek and Roman mythology a Sicilian nymph and, according to Alcimus, a daughter of Uranus and Gaia or of Briareus. Stephanus of Byzantium says that according to one account Aetna was a daughter of Oceanus. Simonides said that she had acted as arbitrator between Hephaestus and Demeter respecting the possession of Sicily. By Zeus or Hephaestus she became the mother of the Palici.

Mount Etna in Sicily was believed to have derived its name from her and under it Zeus buried Typhon, Enceladus, or Briareus. The mountain itself was believed to be the place in which Hephaestus and the Cyclopes made the thunderbolts for Zeus.
