= Adrano =

Adrano Dirnò (Sicilian) Adernó (Greek)
- Comune
- Comune di Adrano
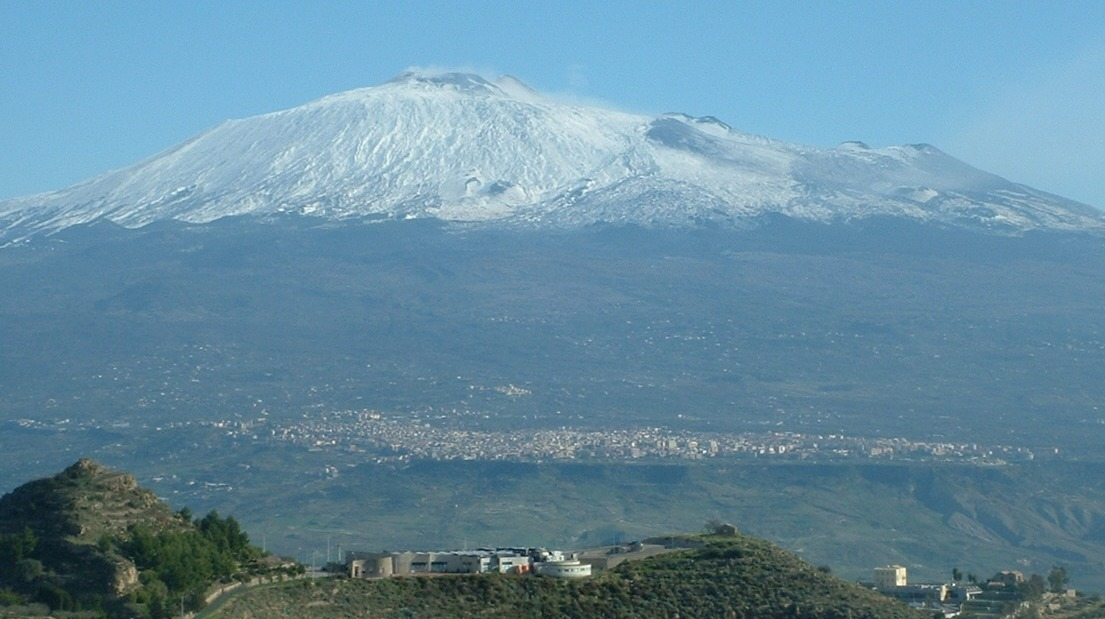

- Coat of arms

- Location of Adrano in Italy Adrano (Sicily)
- Coordinates: 37°40′N 14°50′E
- Country: Italy
- Region: Sicily
- Metropolitan city: Catania (CT)

Government
  - Mayor: Fabio Mancuso

Area
  - Total: 83.22 km^{2} (32.13 sq mi)
- Elevation: 560 m (1,840 ft)

Population (30 April 2017)
  - Total: 35,767
  - Density: 429.8/km^{2} (1,113/sq mi)
- Demonym: Adraniti
- Time zone: UTC+1 (CET)
  - Summer (DST): UTC+2 (CEST)
- Postal code: 95031
- Dialing code: 095
- Patron saint: Nicolò Politi; Vincent of Saragossa
- Saint day: 3 August
- Website: www.comune.adrano.ct.it

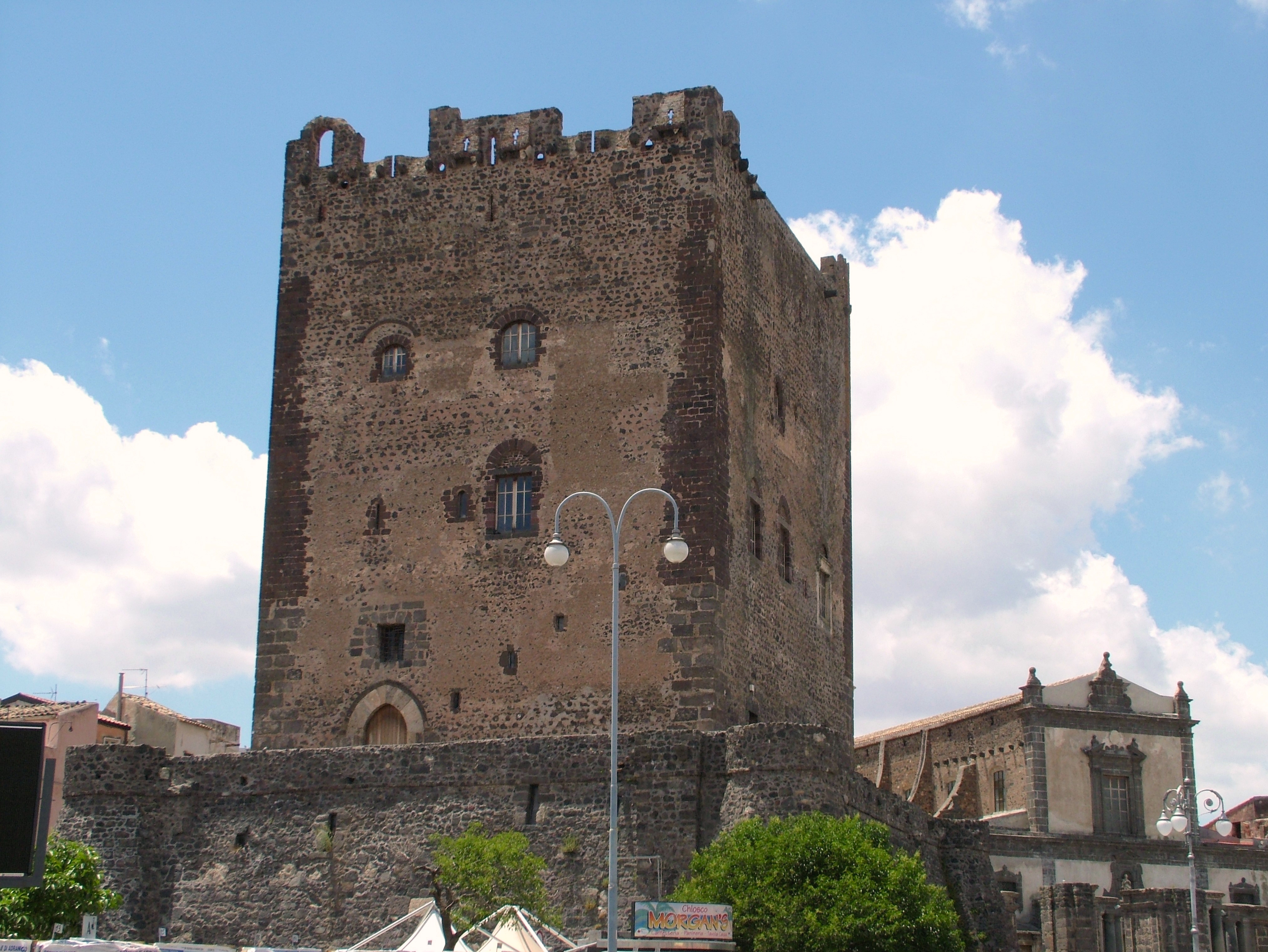
Norman castle in Adrano.

Adrano (Italian: [aˈdraːno]; Adernò until 1929; Sicilian: Ddirnò), ancient Adranon, is a town and comune in the Metropolitan City of Catania on the east coast of Sicily.

It is situated around 41 kilometres (25 mi) northwest of Catania, which was also the capital of the province to which Adrano belonged, now a metropolitan city. It lies near the foot of Mount Etna, at the confluence of the Simeto and Salso rivers. It is the commercial center for a region where olives and citrus fruit are grown. Neighbouring towns include: Biancavilla, Bronte, Paternò, Randazzo, Santa Maria di Licodia and Centuripe.

== History ==
=== Founding and pre-Christian era ===
The settlement was founded by Dionysius the Elder around 400 BC, intending to strengthen Syracusan power in the region. He named the town Adranon in honour of Adranus.

In 344 BC the troops of Timoleon fought the forces of the Syracusan commander Iketas of Leontini near Adrano. During the following years, Adrano was frequently harried by Campanian mercenaries, called the Mamertinians.

The Romans conquered the growing township in 263 BC and declared it a civitas stipendiaria, obliging it to pay a costly tribute to Rome. The consul Valerius ravaged the town, enslaved the inhabitants and sold them as workers and slaves to the aratores (farmers) residing in the near city of Centuripe. In 137 BC, Eunus led an unsuccessful slave revolt against the Roman suppressors, and from then on, Adrano was nothing more than part of Centuripe.

The Romans referred to the city as Adranum or Hadranum.

=== Byzantine Empire, Arabs and Normans ===
The township was pillaged several times by Germanic tribes during the fall of the Western Roman Empire. Only through the reign of Theodoric the Great (495–526), the conditions improved due to the administration by Cassiodorus. In the mid-6th century it was conquered by the Eastern Roman Empire.

Around 950, the Arab Musa occupied the city of Centuripe and its vicinity, and thenceforth Adrano became part of the emirate of Sicily.

The Arabs ruled the region until in 1075 the Normans, led by Hugo of Yersey, succeeded in conquering the region against the resistance of Caid Albucazar. Adrano became part of the Diocese of Catania, administered by the monk Ansgerius. The citizens of the prospering township continued the successful agricultural and economic work the Arabs had initiated. Therefore, the Norman era was enormously influenced by winegrowing, leather work and silk manufacturing.

=== Late Middle Ages and feudalism ===
The arrival of the Hohenstaufen around the end of the 12th century brought enduring difficulties and disputes over Sicily and its inhabitants. The remaining Arabs were vehemently pursued by the administration, which forced them to gather inside the fortresses of Troina, Entella and Centuripe, offering armed resistance. The insurrection was ended violently, and the survivors were massacred or kidnapped. Pope Clement IV made Charles of Anjou king of Sicily in 1265, which ended the Hohenstaufen rule of southern Italy. During that time, Adrano was rather a small settlement of hunters, and the number of inhabitants had decreased from 1,000 to 300.

In 1282, the Sicilian Vespers ended the French reign in Sicily, and Peter III of Aragon became king. The following years were characterized by constant conflicts between the residing farmers and the Bourgeoisie of the region. Adrano fell to the property of the Catalan landholder Garzia de Linguida, and eventually, in 1286, to the ownership of Luca Pellegrino. The estates and soils of the region were subject to immense disputes between several landowners and noblemen in the following time until the 15th century.

From the 15th century on, Sicily was reigned by the so-called vice kings. Between 1412 and 1515, Adrano was under administration by the Moncada family. Giovan Tommaso Moncada (1466–1501) renovated the Norman castle and fortified it. He allowed a couple of refugees from the northern Greek region of Epirus to settle down in the vicinity of Adrano, which is how the town of Biancavilla was founded. The relatives of earl Moncada build many manors (so-called palazzi) in the centre of the town, among which is the latter town hall, and the centre of the city, the piazza, became popular meeting place for the residents, who meanwhile numbered around 6,000. Around the same time began the construction of the Monastero di Santa Lucia (Monastery of St Lucy). In 1693, a severe earthquake inflicted heavy damage to the town.

=== 18th, 19th and 20th century ===
Since the beginning of the 18th century and until around 1820, Adrano suffered from enduring riots and changes taking place in Italy and particularly Sicily, as was the Risorgimento. Adrano became the main administrative town of the vicinity in 1819 and hosted the local court.

Giuseppe Garibaldi landed in Sicily in 1860 and many reforms took place. On 1 July 1860, a town council was installed in Adrano, and don Lorenzo Ciancio was made chairman. The famous Teatro Bellini (Bellini theatre) dates from that time and testifies to the various diversifications the city underwent in that very period. A hospital was instituted as well, and meanwhile Adrano was considered the wealthiest town in the region.

In the 1920s, the reformist preacher don Vincenzo Bascetta appeared in Adrano, and, together with the young anti-fascist high school teacher Carmelo Salanitro, he passionately fought for the peasants' rights. Due to their initiative, large parts of the surrounding lava landscape were transformed into olive and almond plantations. Carmelo Salanitro was murdered in a gas chamber at Mauthausen-Gusen concentration camp in the night between the 23 and 24 April 1945.

Adrano was the scene of much fighting during the latter phases of Operation Husky, the Allied invasion of Sicily, during World War II. Nazi forces were driven from the island and in the course of their retreat they attempted to hold the northeastern corner of Sicily in the hopes that they would eventually be able to retake the entire island while using the northeastern portion of the island as a way to resupply their forces from the south of the Italian peninsula. The Nazis had to abandon this plan when the British 30th Corps forced their way into Adrano while at the same time the British 13th Corps battled the Nazis in the nearby town of Randazzo. Once Adrano and Randazzo fell to the British, the Nazis decided they had no choice but to retire to Messina and use it to evacuate the rest of their forces from Sicily.

=== Name ===
The Romans changed the name of the township into Hadranum; during the occupation by the Arabs it was called Adarnu or sometimes Adarna, while the Normans referred to it as Adernio and Adriano. Until 1929 its official name was Adernò, until eventually it was changed into Adrano. Several elder inhabitants of the town still call it Adernò.

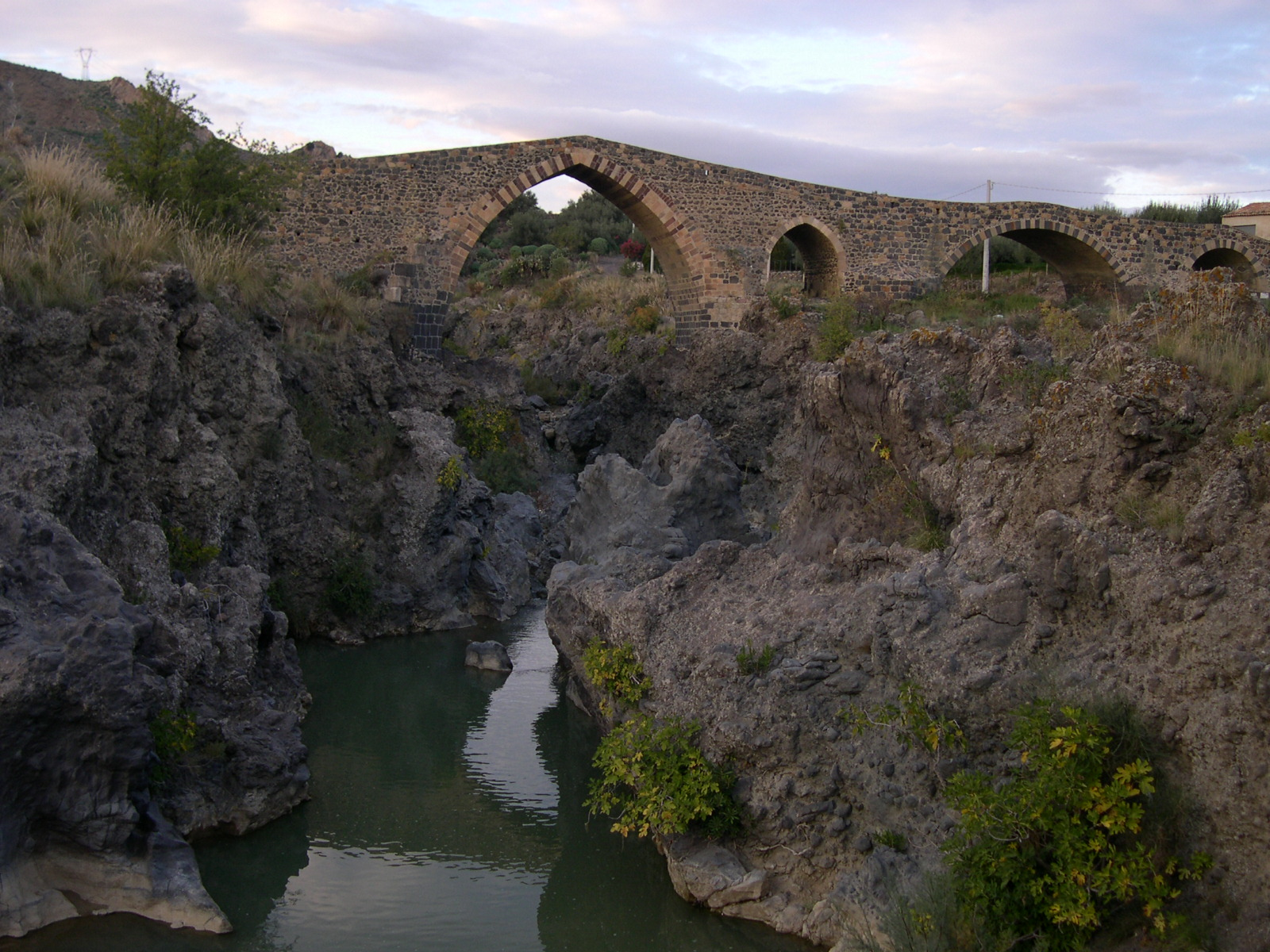
Ponte dei Saraceni.

== Main sights ==
- Castle of Norman origin (Castello Normanno is a donjon) in the centre of the town, built in 1070 on behalf of Roger I. Inside the castle is the archaeological museum with antique findings of the region.
- Chiesa Madre (Mother Church): houses the 16th-century Moncada Polyptych and works by Giuseppe Guzzardi and Angelo La Naia.
- Santa Lucia Monastery in via Roma, constructed in 1596 to the order of the prince of Biscari and redesigned by the well-known Catanese architect Stefano Ittar. It contains a chapel dating from 1775. Until the early 1920s, the monastery was still inhabited by monks, but now is public and private property, partly used by a secondary school.
- Santa Maria del Rosario: Church adjacent to former Dominican monastery
- Giardino della Vittoria or Villa Comunale: public park in front of the St Lucy Monastery, with a promenade between mature palm trees
- Teatro Bellini: public theater was re-opened in 2004 after over 26 years. It was built on behalf of the vice king in 1779 and resembles the theatre of Parma dating from 1618. It is situated on the ruins of the antique church of St Vito.
- Ponte dei Saraceni (Bridge of the Saracens) about 3 km outside the town
- The ruins of the original Greek settlement visitable in the east of the town.

Due to the Catholic tradition of the region, Adrano has numerous antique chapels and small churches hidden in the backstreets. Moreover, Adrano is famous for its colourful carnival and the celebration of San Nicola, in honour of its patron Saint Nicola Politi on 3 August.

== Transportation ==
Adrano is linked to the rapidway SS 121 leading from Paternò to Catania. Near Belpasso, a large mall named Etnapolis has been opened recently.

Adrano is connected to the province capital Catania by a bus route which is operated by the FCE and leads through various towns to the central station of Catania and further to the communal beach. A rapid bus skips the smaller towns and leads to Catania directly over the highway. In the summer season, a bus connects Adrano, Bronte, Randazzo, Floresta and Naso in the province of Messina. Between the station of Catania-Borgo and Riposto operates the Littorina, a nostalgic Diesel fuelled train which stops in Adrano, Paternò, Biancavilla, Santa Maria di Licodia and other towns. The extension of a route of the rapid transit railway of Catania to Paternò and Adrano has been planned and the constructions have begun. Adrano is not linked with the national train system of Trenitalia. Moreover, the FCE operates two bus routes (A and B) in Adrano.

== Health ==
Adrano does not possess any hospital but only a so-called Guardia medica, a paramedic station with emergency personnel, vehicles and equipment. The nearest hospital is the Maria SS. Addolorata in Biancavilla, which is on stand-by as well for emergencies in Adrano.

Maria Tizziano is the youngest mother in Italian history; she became a mother in 1992 at 11 years old.
