= Silenus Calatinus =

Sicilian Greek historian

Silenus Calatinus (Σιληνός) was a Sicilian Greek historian of Magna Graecia of the 2nd century BC who wrote a history in Greek of Hannibal's campaign in Italy from 218 to 204 BC. His work is known only from fragments and borrowings by other authors.

Silenus was probably a native of Caleacte in northern Sicily. Along with Sosylus of Lacedaemon he accompanied Hannibal during his campaign, and therefore was able to provide a contemporaneous, first-hand account. Lucius Coelius Antipater largely based much of his Latin history of the Second Punic War on Silenus; Polybius, Livy, and Cicero also referenced him.
