= Embassy of Turkey, London =

Diplomatic mission of Turkey in the United Kingdom

Embassy of Turkey in London
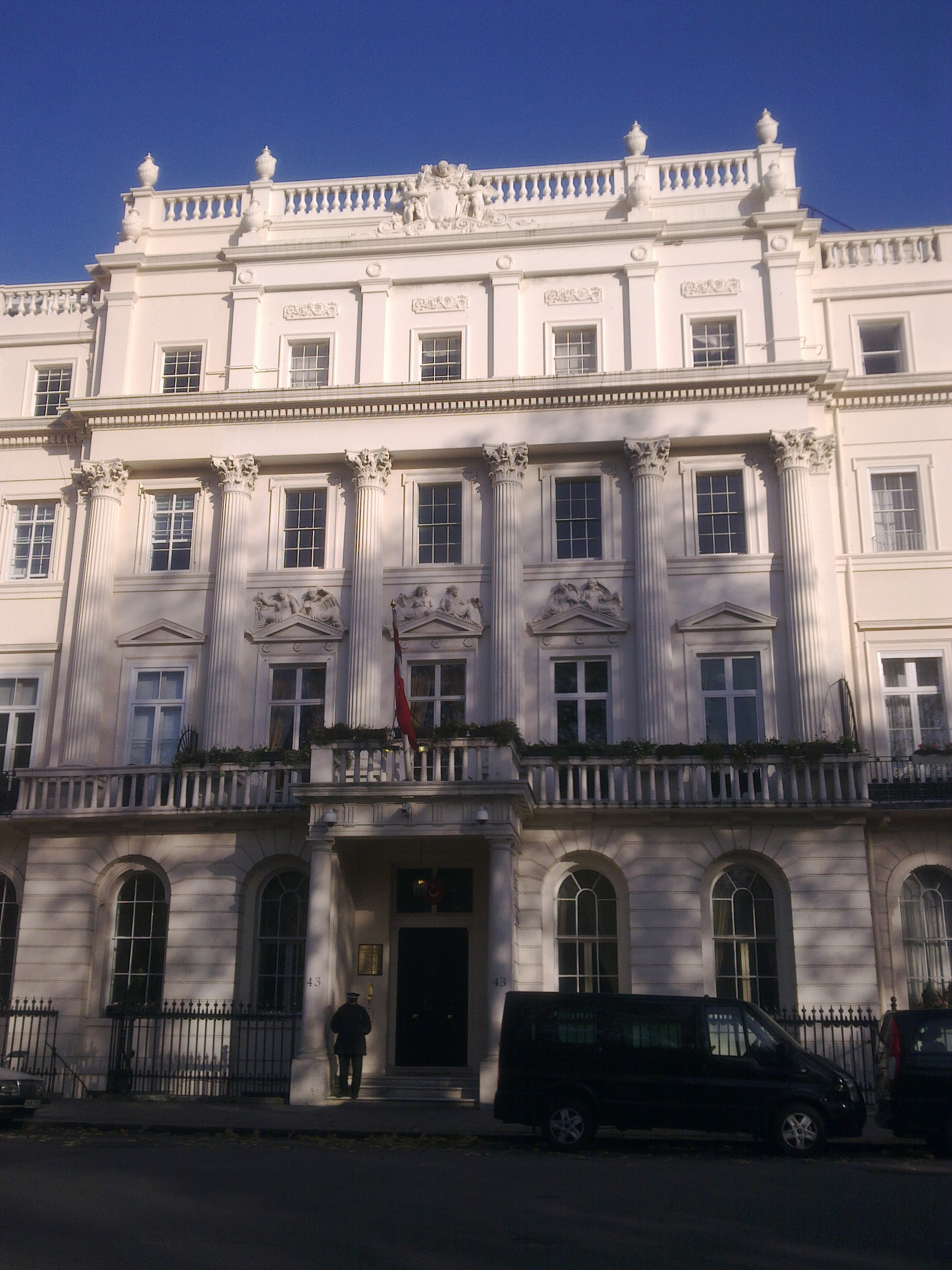
- Location: Belgravia
- Address: Belgrave Square; London, SW1
- Coordinates: 51°29′59.5″N 0°9′8.7″W
- Ambassador: Osman Koray Ertaş

The Embassy of Turkey in London is the diplomatic mission of Turkey in the United Kingdom. There was an embassy of the Ottoman Empire in London dating from 1793; this was suspended in 1914 following the outbreak of the First World War and replaced by the embassy of the new Republic of Turkey in 1924. From 1901-1954 the embassy was located at 69 Portland Place before moving to its current location; however this building was kept and is currently used as the Ambassador's Residence.

The embassy is housed in one of a group of Grade I listed buildings at 38—48 Belgrave Square.

Turkey also maintains a Consulate at Rutland Lodge, Rutland Gardens, Knightsbridge.

== History of The Mission ==
The Ottoman Empire began sending its first resident representatives to Europe at the end of the 18th century in order to be informed about developments in Europe. The first of these ambassadors was Yusuf Agah Efendi, who was appointed to London in 1793. From this date on, there has always been a Turkish diplomatic mission in London. The only exception was the interruption of diplomatic relations between the Ottoman Empire and England in 1914 due to World War I. Following the establishment of the Republic of Turkey on October 29, 1923, diplomatic relations were revived on September 2, 1924.

The areas of duty of the Embassy are the United Kingdom (United Kingdom of Great Britain and Northern Ireland), the Islands of Man, Jersey and Guernsey.

There are two Consulates General (Edinburgh and London) serving under our Embassy in the United Kingdom. In addition, our Honorary Consulate serves in Belfast.

Within our embassy, there are the Armed Forces Attaché, Justice Counselor, Press Counselor, Internal Affairs Counselor and Trade Counselor serving in the same building. In addition, the Religious Services Counselor, Education Counselor, Culture and Promotion Counselor and the Central Bank Representative Office serve in separate buildings. The Labor and Social Security Attaché in the embassy serves in the Consulate General building.

== Important Events ==
- 1793: The first resident embassy of the Ottoman Empire opens in London
- 15 July 1840: The Convention of London was a treaty with the title of Convention for the Pacification of the Levant, signed between Britain, Austria, Prussia, Russia and the Ottoman Empire.
- 12–23 July 1867: Sultan Abdulaziz visits London
- 13 March 1871: Treaty of London signed by Germany, Austria, the Ottoman Empire, Britain, France, Russia, and Italy
- 1880: Anglo-Ottoman Convention was a treaty between Britain and the Ottoman Empire.
- 1901: The embassy moves from 1 Bryanston Square to 69 Portland Place
- 1914: Suspension of relations between the two countries due to World War I
- 1924: The embassy of the Republic of Turkey resumes its activities in London
- 1 August 1950: Turkey applies for membership in NATO, which was headquartered in London at the time
- 1954: The embassy chancellery moves to 43 Belgrave Square
- 29 August 1955: The London Conference on Cyprus under British administration
- 17 February 1959: The plane carrying Prime Minister Adnan Menderes, who was travelling to the United Kingdom for the London Conference, crashes near London
- 19 February 1959: Cyprus Signing of the London Agreement regarding the future of the island
- 1-8 November 1967: Visits of President Mr. Cevdet Sunay to the United Kingdom
- 12-15 November 1987: Visits of President Mr. Kenan Evren to the United Kingdom
- 6-9 November 2010: Visits of President Mr. Abdullah Gül to the United Kingdom (to receive the Chatham House award)
- 20-24 November 2011: State visits of President Mr. Abdullah Gül to the United Kingdom
- 30-31 March 2011: Visit of Prime Minister Mr. Recep Tayyip Erdoğan to the United Kingdom
- 26-28 July 2012: Visit of Prime Minister Mr. Recep Tayyip Erdoğan to the United Kingdom (to attend the opening ceremonies of the Olympic games)
- 4-5 September 2014: President Recep Tayyip Erdoğan's visits to the United Kingdom (to attend the NATO Wales Summit)
- December 3-4, 2019: President Recep Tayyip Erdoğan's visits to the United Kingdom (to attend the NATO London Summit)

== Ambassadors ==
- Yusuf Agah Efendi (1793–1798)
- İsmail Ferruh Efendi (1798–1801)
- Argiropulos Efendi (1801–1806)
- Sıdkı Efendi (1806–1810)
- Antonaki Ramadani Efendi (1810–1811)
- Jean de Mavroyeni (1811–1834)
- Mehmed Namık Pasha (1834–1835)
- Mehmed Nuri Efendi (1835–1836)
- Mustafa Reşid Pasha (1836–1837)
- Ibrahim Sarim Pasha (1837–1838)
- Ahmed Fethi Pasha (Feb.1838 - Apr.1838)
- Mustafa Reşid Pasha (1838–1839)
- Mehmed Şekip Efendi (1840–1842)
- Mehmed Emin Âli Pasha (1842–1845)
- Ibrahim Sarim Pasha (Jan 1845 – Dec. 1845)
- Mehmed Şekip Efendi (1845–1846)
- Alexandros Kallimachis (1846–1848)
- Kıbrıslı Mehmed Emin Pasha (1849–1850)
- Konstantinos Mousouros (1851–1885)
- Rüstem Mariani (1885–1895)
- Constantine Anthopoulos (1896–1902)
- Stephanos Mousouros (1903–1907)
- Mehmed Rifat Paşa (1907–1909)
- Ahmet Tevfik Pasha (1909–1914)
- Yusuf Kemal Tengirşenk (11.01.1924 - 1.09.1924)
- Zekai Apaydın (10.09.1924 - 1.06.1925)
- Ahmet Ferit Tek (1.06.1925 - 1.06.1932)
- Munir Ertegun (22.07.1932 - 1.03.1934)
- Fethi Okyar (1.03.1934 - 1.01.1939)
- Tevfik Rüştü Aras (1.01.1939 - 1.03.1942)
- Rauf Orbay (23.03.1942 - 1.04.1944)
- Ruşen Eşref Ünaydın (17.04.1944 - 8.11.1945)
- Cevat Açıkalın (8.11.1945 - 1.03.1952)
- Hüseyin Ragıp Baydur (3.03.1952 - 26.02.1955)
- Suat Hayri Ürgüplü (15.09.1955 - 1.05.1957)
- Muharrem Nuri Birgi (1.06.1957 - 4.08.1960)
- Feridun Cemal Erkin (29.08.1960 - 28.03.1962)
- Kemal Kavur (1.10.1962 - 4.11.1963)
- Zeki Kuneralp (7.01.1964 - 4.07.1966)
- Haluk Bayülken (14.07.1966 - 26.07.1969)
- Zeki Kuneralp (20.08.1969 - 27.10.1972)
- Rıfat Turgut Menemencioğlu (30.11.1972 - 16.08.1978)
- Vahap Aşiroğlu (2.10.1978 - 13.07.1981)
- Rahmi Gümrükçüoğlu (20.07.1981 - 27.12.1988)
- Nurver Nureş (15.01.1989 - 27.09.1991)
- Candemir Önhon (30.09.1991 - 17.05.1995)
- Özdem Sanberk (1.05.1995 - 1.03.2000)
- Korkmaz Haktanır (1.04.2000 - 1.12.2002)
- Akın Alptuna (1.02.2003 - 1.05.2007)
- Mehmet Yiğit Alpogan (21.07.2007 - 26.06.2010)
- Ahmet Ünal Çeviköz (15.07.2010 - 28.06.2014)
- Abdurrahman Bilgiç (8.07.2014 - 26.09.2018)
- Ümit Yalçın (27.09.2018 - 6.03.2023)
- Osman Koray Ertaş (14.03.2023 - Till Today)

== Gallery ==
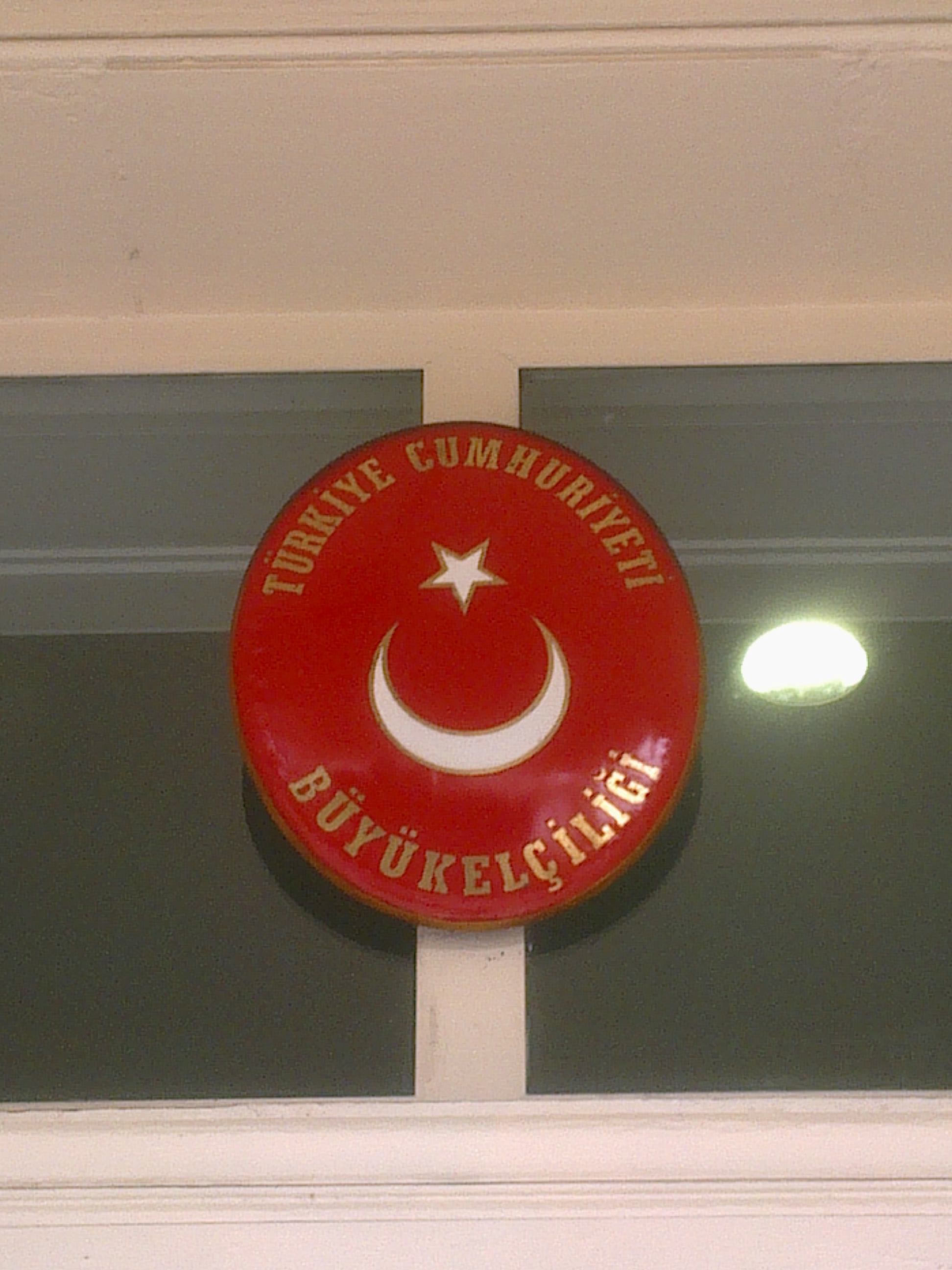
Plaque above the entrance

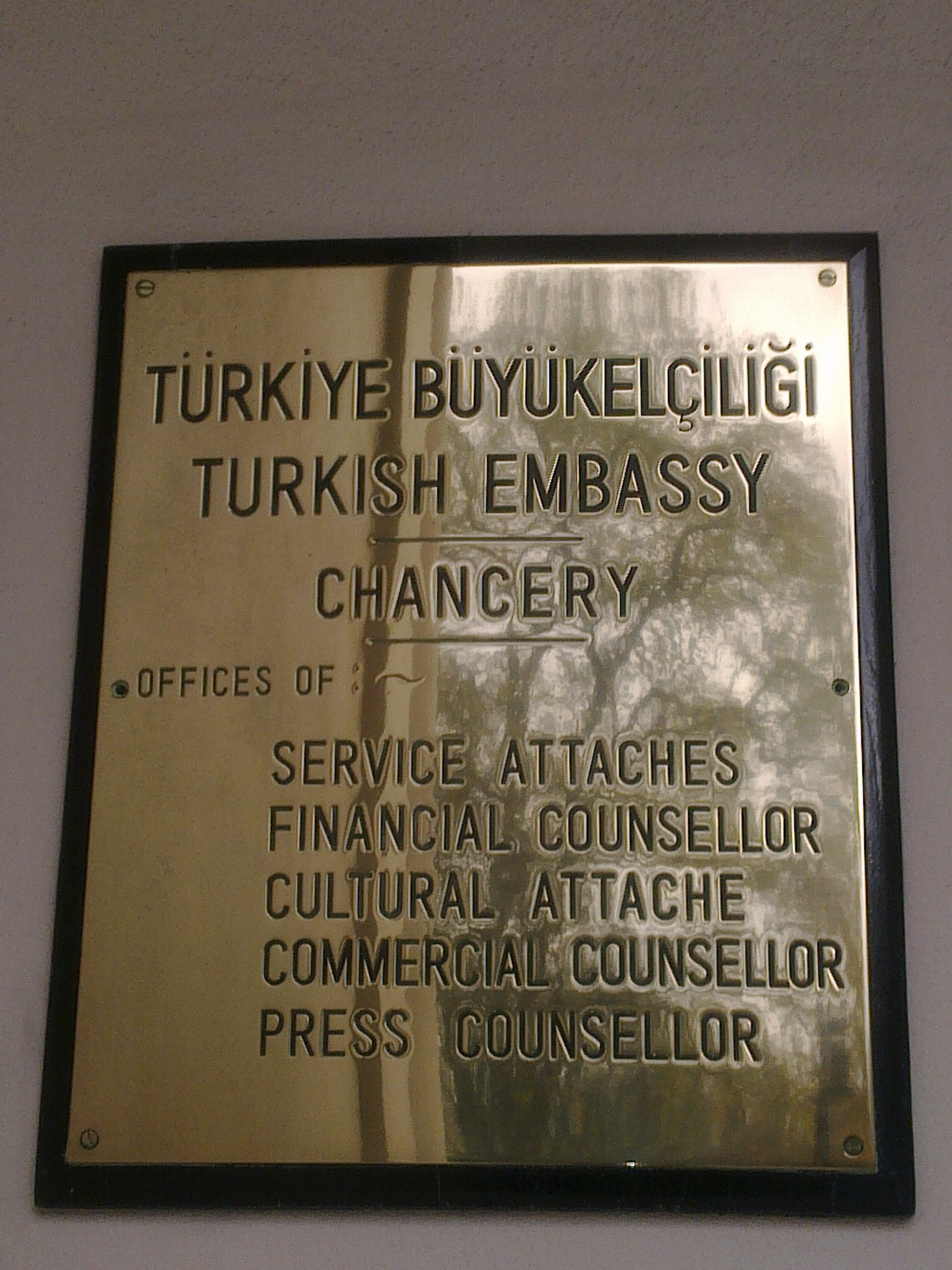
Plaque outside the embassy in English and Turkish

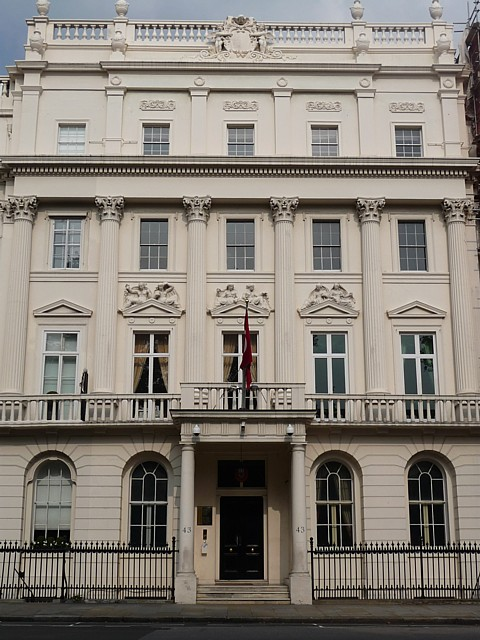
The embassy

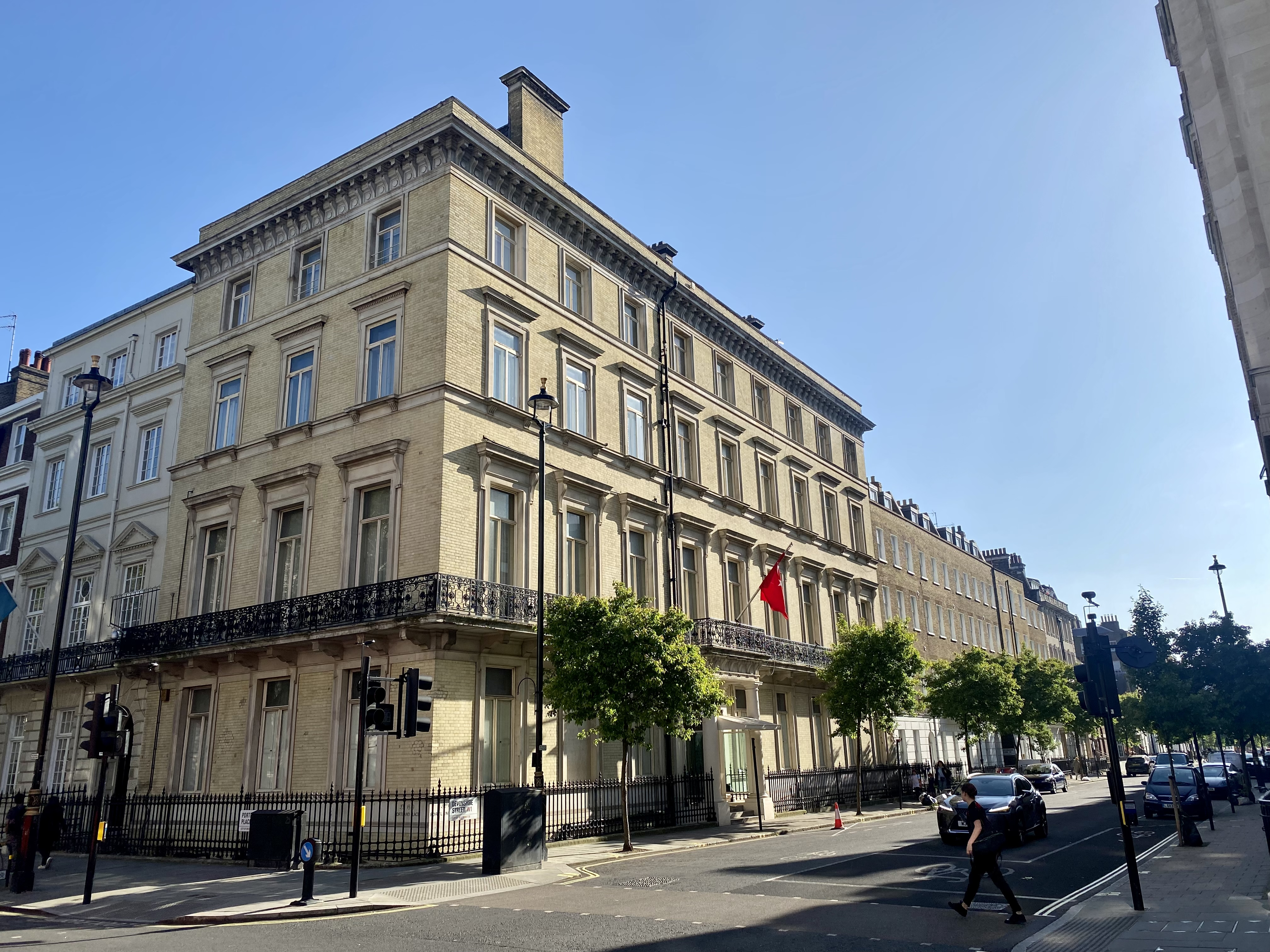
The Ambassador's Residence on Portland Place
