= Anna de Noailles =

French writer (1876–1933)

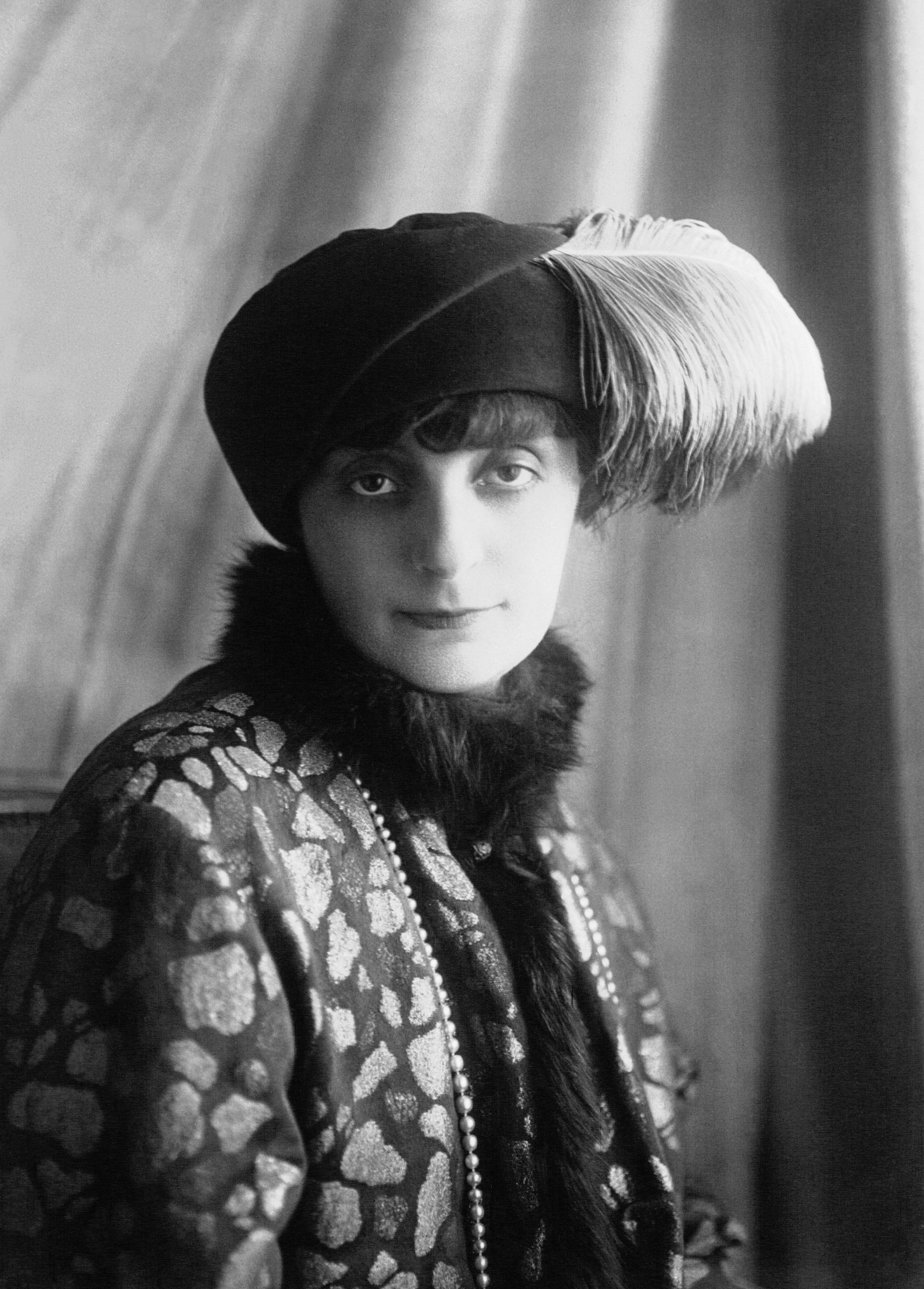
- Anna, Comtesse de Noailles, 1922
- Born: Anna Elisabeth Bibesco-Bassaraba de Brancovan; 15 November 1876; Paris, France
- Died: 30 April 1933 (aged 56); Paris, France
- Resting place: Père Lachaise Cemetery
- Occupations: Novelist, poet
- Spouse: Mathieu Fernand Frédéric Pascal de Noailles (m. 1897)
- Children: 1, Anne-Jules de Noailles
- Parent(s): Grégoire Bibesco-Bassaraba; Ralouka Mussurus
- Relatives: Gheorghe Bibescu (grandfather); Konstantinos Mousouros (grandfather); Stephanos Mousouros (uncle); Léon de Montesquiou (cousin); Antoine Bibesco (cousin); George Valentin Bibescu (cousin)
- Writing career
- Language: French
- Notable awards: Commander of the Legion of Honour

Anna, Comtesse Mathieu de Noailles (Anna Elisabeth Bibesco-Bassaraba de Brancovan; French pronunciation: [ana d(ə) nɔaj]; 15 November 1876 – 30 April 1933) was a French writer of Romanian and Greek descent, a poet and a socialist feminist. She was the only female poet of her time in France to receive the highest public recognition, the Grand Prix of the Académie Française.

== Biography ==
=== Personal life ===
Born Princess Anna Elisabeth Bibesco-Bassaraba de Brancovan in Paris, she was a descendant of the Bibescu, Craioveşti and Mavrocordato families of Romanian boyars. Her father was Prince Grégoire Bibesco-Bassaraba, a son of Wallachian Prince Gheorghe Bibesco and Zoe Mavrocordato-Bassaraba de Brancovan.

Her Greek mother was Ralouka (Rachel) Mussurus, daughter of Konstantinos Mousouros and a member of the Mousouros family. She was a musician and pianist, who studied with Camille O'Meara (Dubois), Frédéric Chopin's last student. The Polish composer Ignacy Paderewski had also dedicated several of his compositions to her.

Noailles was extremely proud of her Greek ancestry. According to historian Catherine Perry, her Greek ancestry:

contains the essence of an entire history and produces the narrative movement of the dedication, for the mythical figure of Noailles is shown to advance from Greece to Asia Minor, before arriving in France as the ultimate goal of her journey. Through a combination of her origins with her French writings, she may stand for a synthesis, or a continuity, between the worlds of Greek antiquity and of contemporary France.

Noailles was also a great-great-granddaughter of Sophronius of Vratsa, one of the leading figures of the Bulgarian National Revival, through his grandson Stefan Bogoridi, caimacam of Moldavia and Prince of Samos.

She had friendly relations with the intellectual, literary and artistic elites of the day, including Marcel Proust, Francis Jammes, Colette, André Gide, Frédéric Mistral, Robert de Montesquiou-Fezensac, Rainer Maria Rilke, Paul Valéry, Jean Cocteau, Pierre Loti, Paul Hervieu, and Max Jacob. She was a cousin of Prince Antoine Bibesco and Princess Marthe Bibesco.

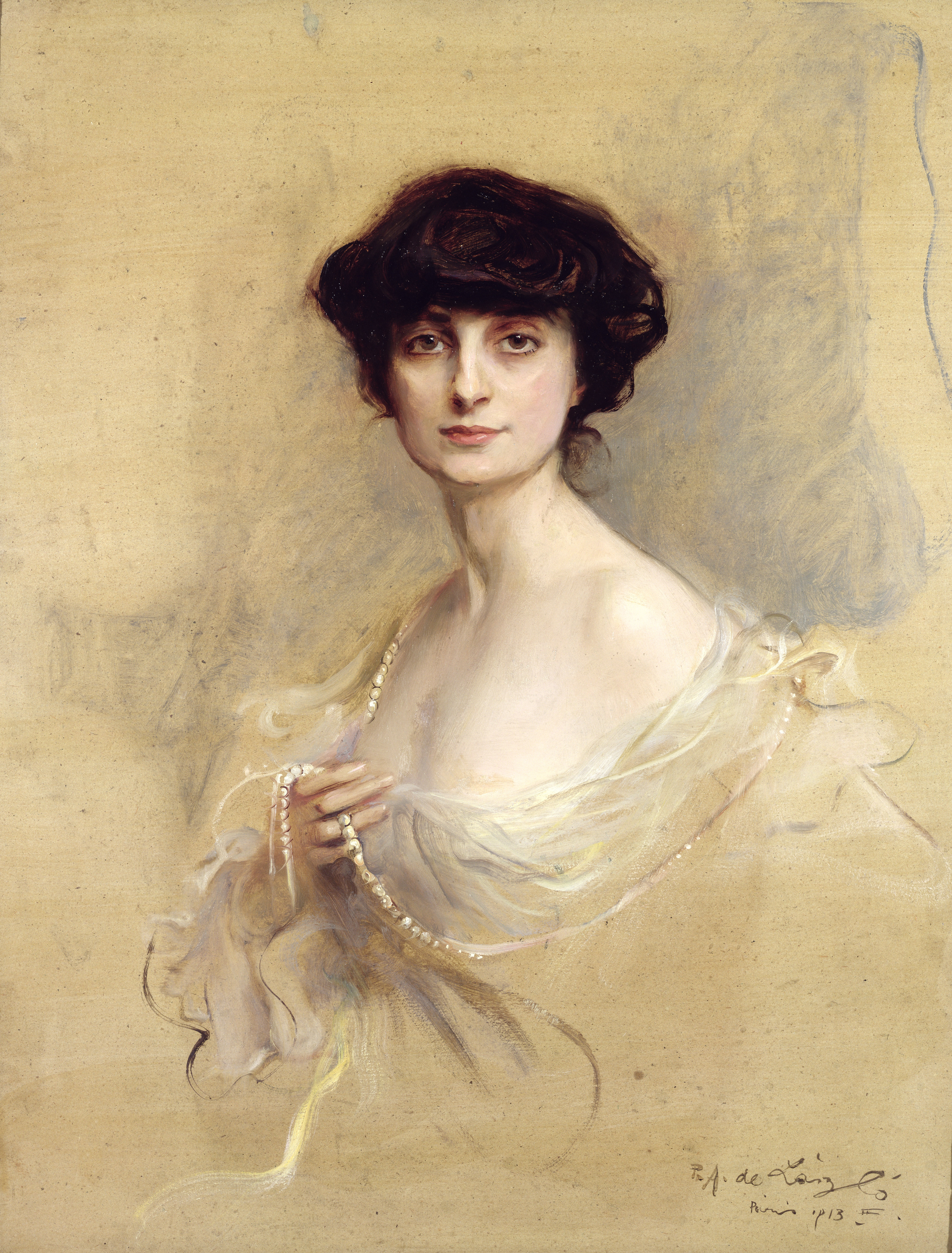
Portrait by Philip de László, 1913

In 1897, she married Mathieu Fernand Frédéric Pascal de Noailles (1873–1942), the fourth son of the 7th Duke de Noailles. The couple soon became the toast of Parisian high society. They had one child, a son, Count Anne-Jules de Noailles (1900–1979). She stood as patron to Alice Sollier in the Légion d'honneur, having been treated at both the doctor's Boulogne sanatorium and her Saint-Cloud clinic.

She died in 1933 in Paris, at the age of 56, and was interred in the Père Lachaise Cemetery.

=== Career ===
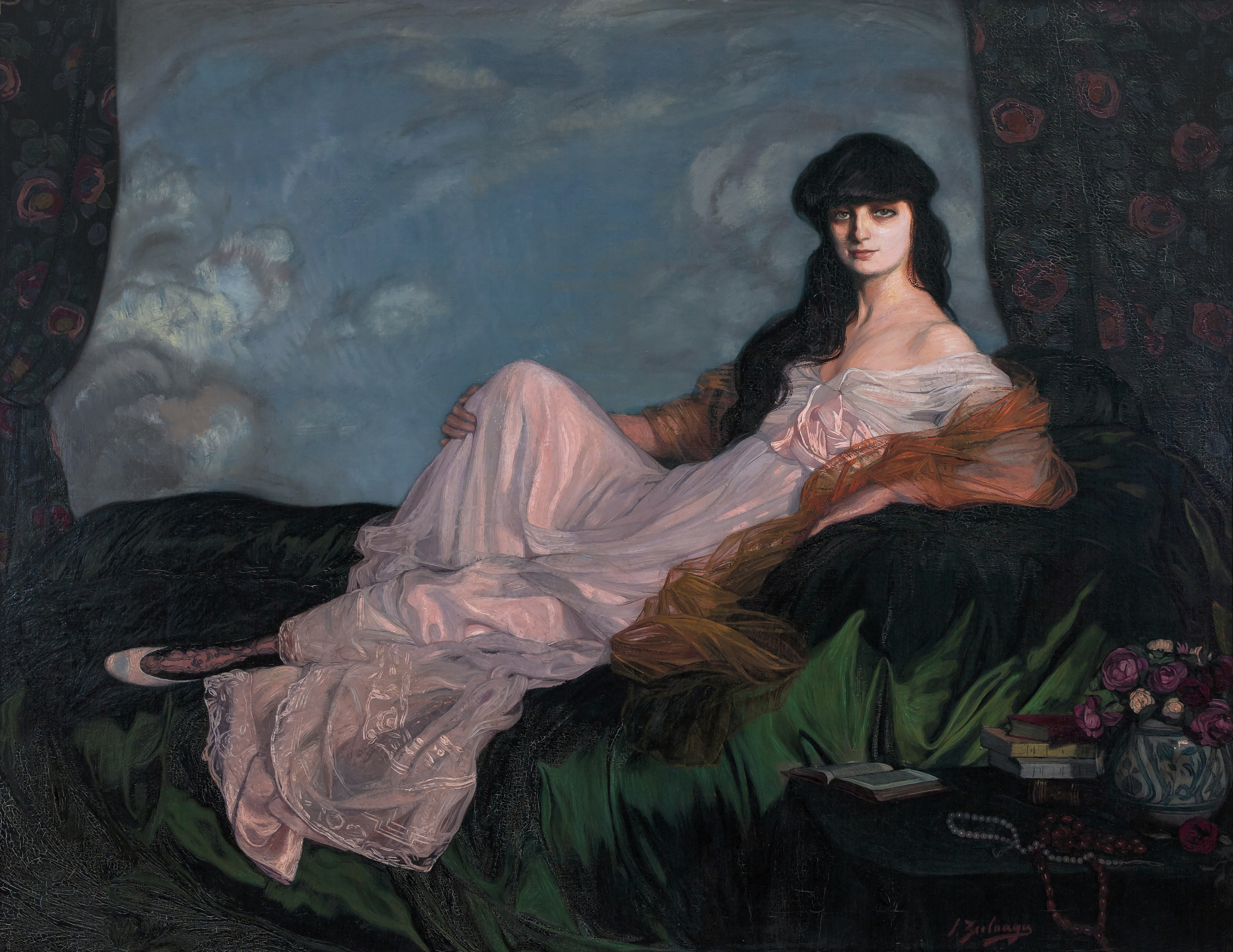
Anna de Noailles, portrait by Ignacio Zuloaga, 1913

Starting with her first collection, Le Coeur innombrable (1901) Anna de Noailles wrote nine volumes of poetry; three novels, including Le Visage émerveillé (1904); a novella on gender relations called Les Innocentes, ou La Sagesse des femmes (1923); a collection of prose poems called Exactitudes (1930); and an autobiography titled Le Livre de ma vie (1932).

A New York Times writer in 1929 wrote that she was "one of the finest poets of present-day France."

=== In fine art ===
Various visual artists of the day painted her portrait, including Antonio de la Gándara, Ignacio Zuloaga, Kees van Dongen, Jacques Émile Blanche, and the British portrait painter Philip de László.

In 1906 her image was sculpted by Auguste Rodin; the clay model can be seen today in the Musée Rodin in Paris, and the finished marble bust is on display in New York City's Metropolitan Museum.

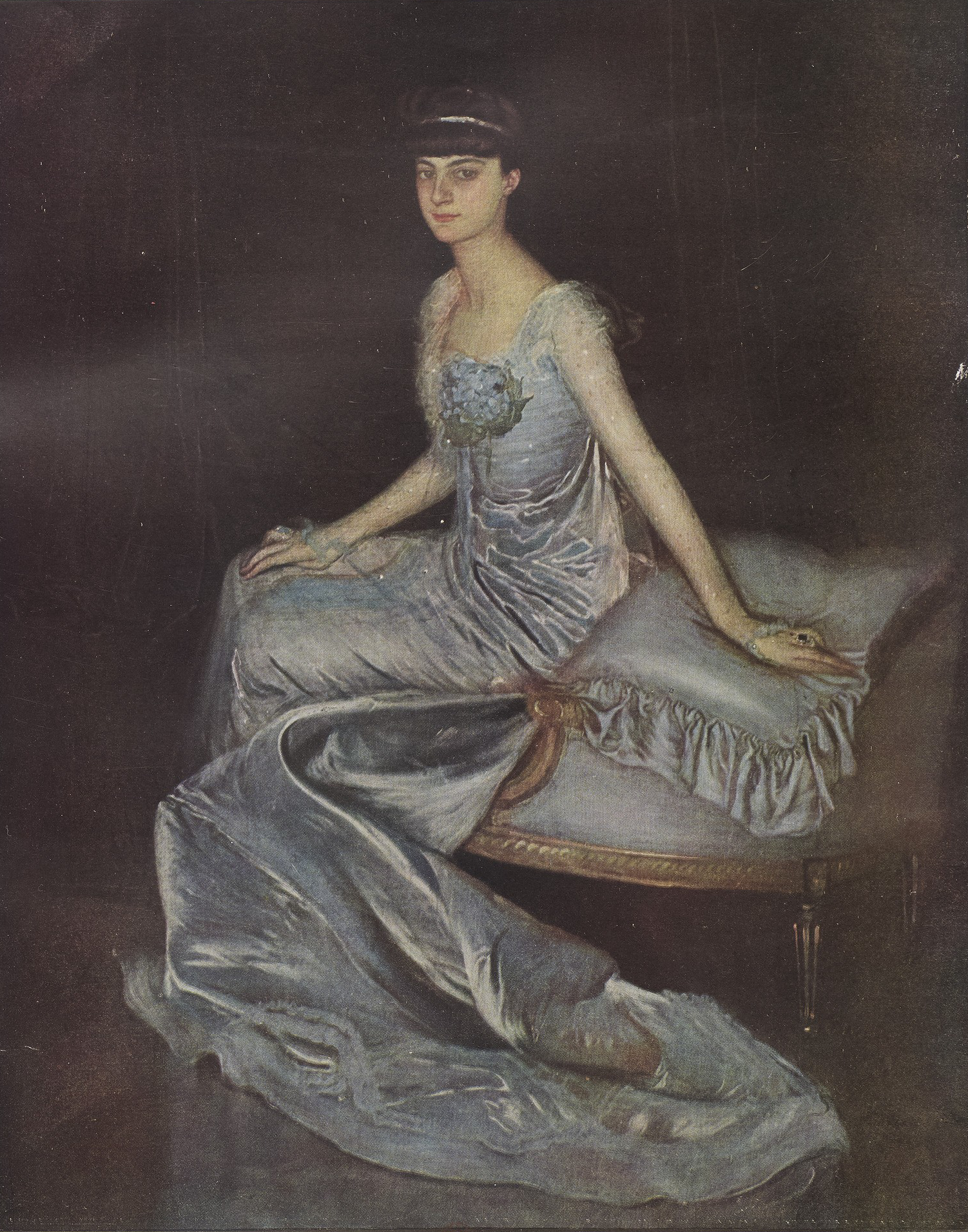
La Comtesse Mathieu de Noailles, 1899 by Antonio de la Gándara

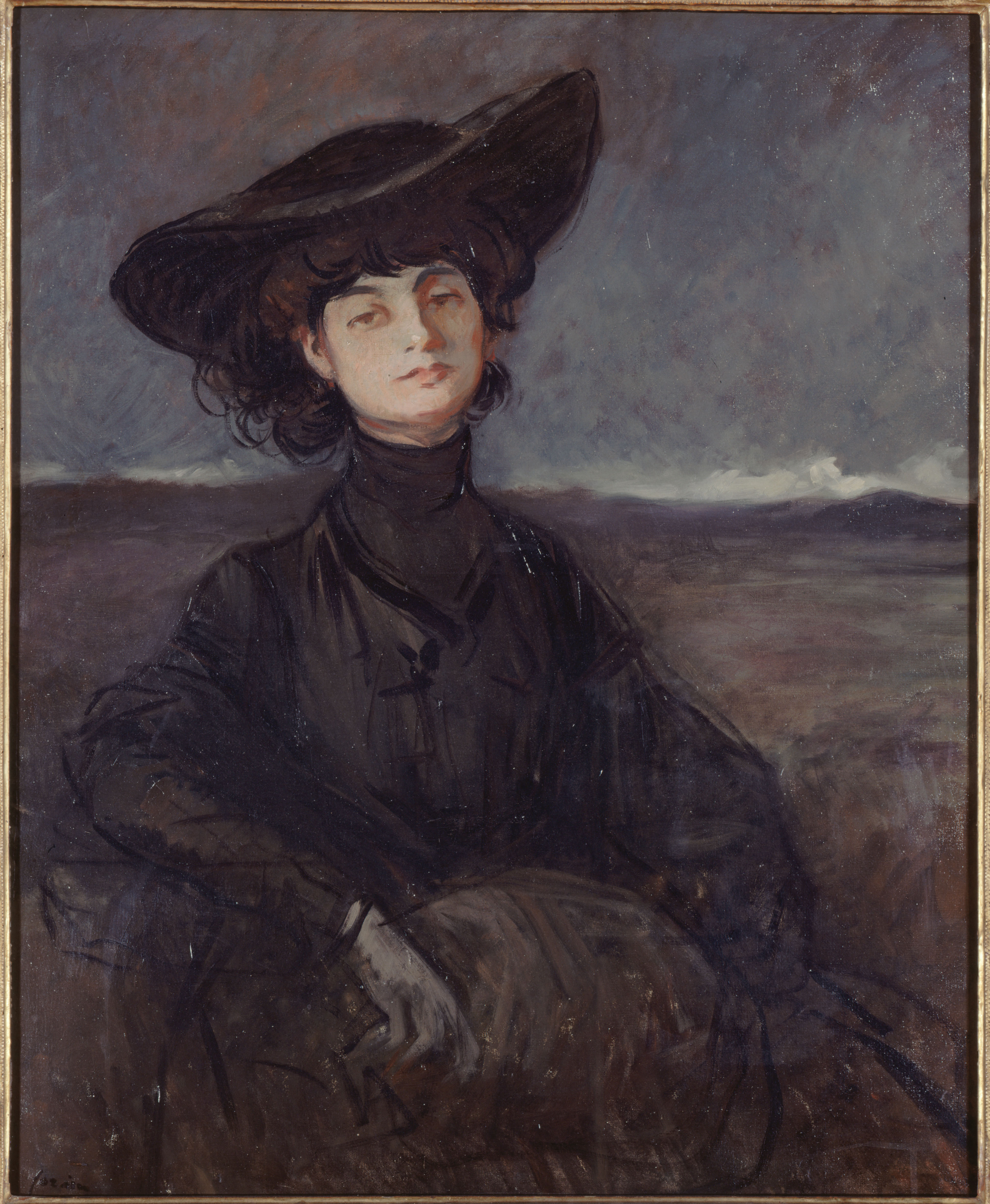
Anna, Comtesse de Noailles, 1914 by Jean-Louis Forain

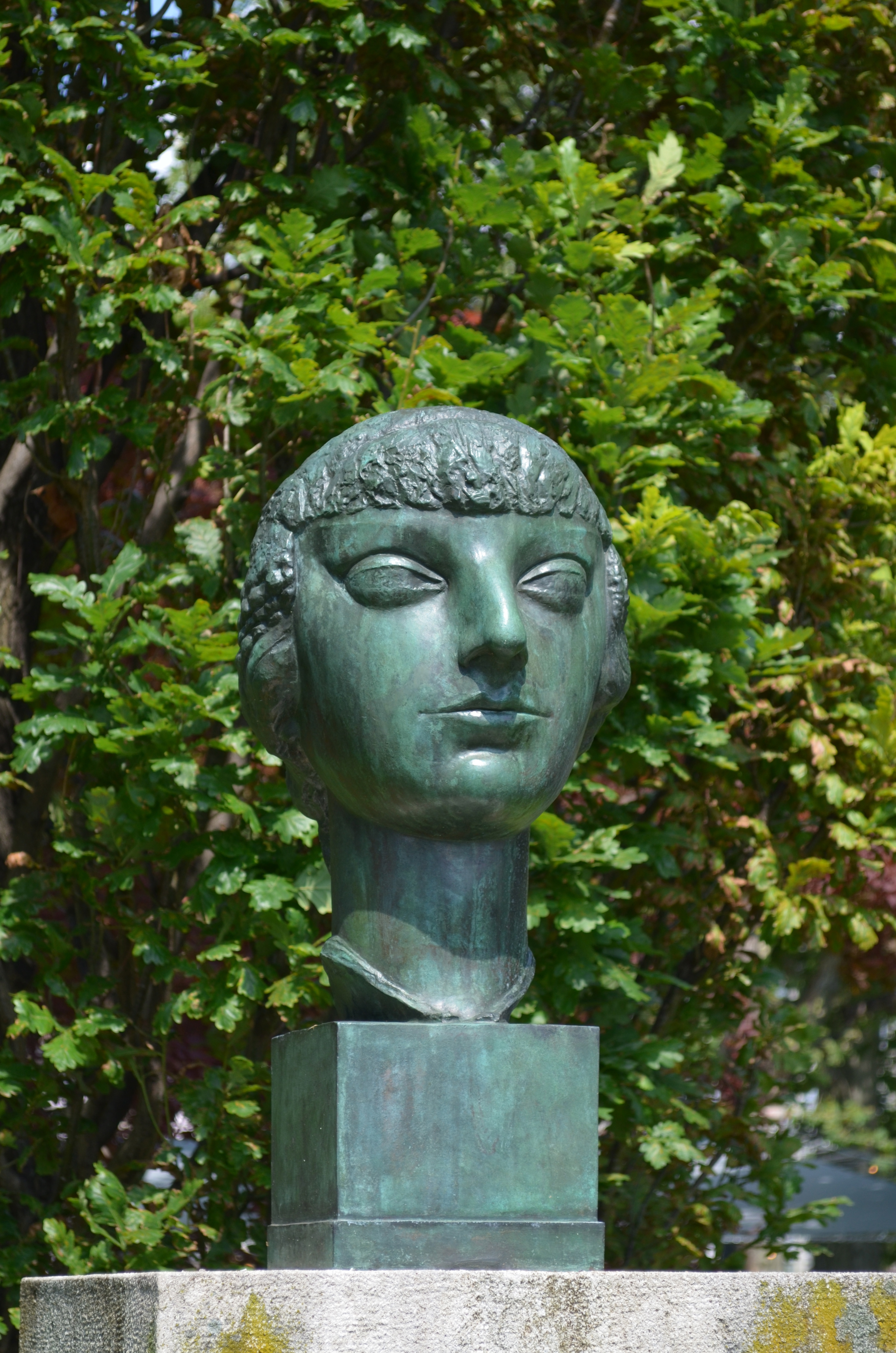
Anna, Comtesse de Noailles, 1936 by James Vibert

== Awards ==
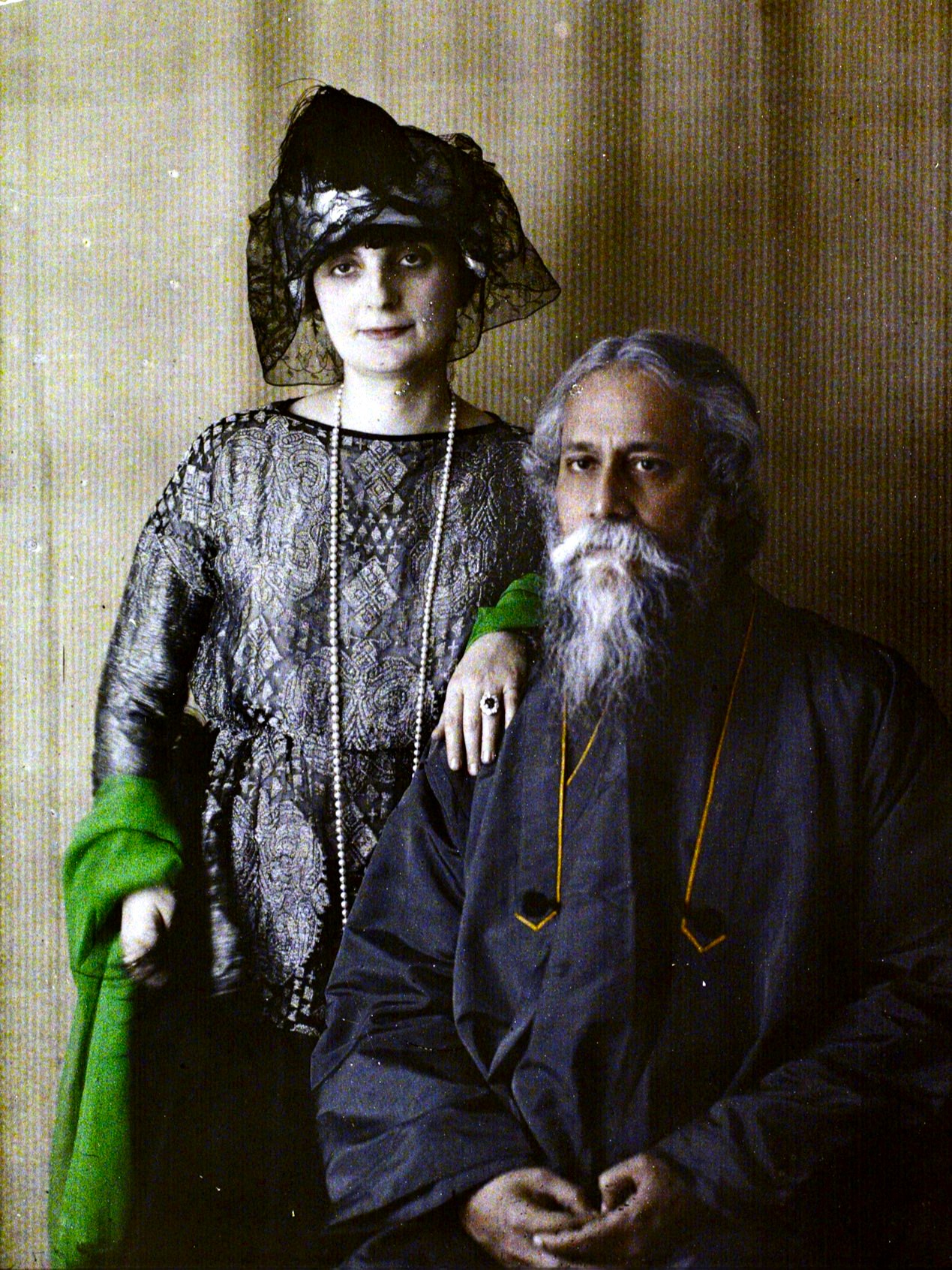
Anna de Noailles with Rabindranath Tagore, 1920. Autochrome by Auguste Léon.

Anna de Noailles was the first woman to become a Commander of the Legion of Honour, the first woman to be received in the Royal Belgian Academy of French Language and Literature, and she was honored with the "Grand Prix" of the Académie Française in 1921.

Countess de Noailles served as a juror with Florence Meyer Blumenthal in awarding the Prix Blumenthal, a grant given between 1919 and 1954 to painters, sculptors, decorators, engravers, writers, and musicians.

== Writings ==
- Le Cœur innombrable (1901)
- L'Ombre des jours (1902)
- La Nouvelle Espérance (1903)
- Le Visage émerveillé (1904)
- La Domination (1905)
- Les Éblouissements (1907)
- Les Vivants et les Morts (1913)
- Les Forces éternelles (1920)
- Les Innocentes, ou La Sagesse des femmes (1923)
- Poème de l'amour (1924)
- L'Honneur de souffrir (1927)
- Exactitudes, Paris (1930)
- Le Livre de ma vie (1932)
- Derniers Vers et Poèmes d'enfance (1934)

== See also ==
- Lesbian poetry
