= Leo Argyros =

Leo Argyros may refer to:

- Leo Argyros (9th century), Byzantine general
- Leo Argyros (10th century), Byzantine general
