= Argyros (Byzantine family) =

Byzantine aristocratic family

Argyros Αργυρός Argyropoulos
- House of the Byzantine land-holding military aristocracy
- Coat of Arms of the Argyros family
- Country: Byzantine Empire
- Founded: 9th century
- Founder: Leo Argyros (first known)
- Final ruler: Romanos III Argyros (Byzantine emperor)

The House of Argyros (Greek: Ἀργυρός, derived from ἄργυρος, "silver"), feminine Argyre (Ἀργυρή), Latinized as Argyrus and Argyra, was the name of a prominent aristocratic family of Roman Emperors of the Byzantine Empire active from the middle of the 9th century until the very end of the Empire in the 15th century, although it passed its peak after the mid-11th century. The name also evolved the variant forms Argyropoulos (Ἀργυρόπουλος) and the feminine Argyropoulina (Ἀργυροπουλίνα).

== History ==
The Argyroi apparently originated in the province of Charsianon, where they had large estates. They hence belonged to the Anatolian land-holding military aristocracy (the "dynatoi"); indeed, they are among the earliest, and almost archetypal, such families to emerge, along with the Doukai. The family is first securely attested in the mid-9th century, but may have its origins in a certain patrikios Marianos and his son Eustathios, who was captured by the Umayyads in 740/41 and executed after refusing to convert to Islam.

Beginning with the family's founder, Leo Argyros, most of the early members were military officers, such as Eustathios Argyros and his sons Leo and Pothos, or Basil Argyros in the 11th century. Basil's brother, the only Argyros from the family's heyday to have become a civil service official, became Emperor Romanos III Argyros (r. 1028–34). In the Komnenian period the family declined in status, and the later Argyroi or Argyropouloi were mostly landholders or intellectuals, among others the astronomer Isaac Argyros, the humanist John Argyropoulos and Argiropulos Efendi, an Ottoman diplomat.

== See also ==
- Argyropoulos family

== Sources ==
- Cheynet, J.-C.; Vannier, J.-F. (2003). "Les Argyroi" (PDF). Zbornik Radova Vizantološkog Instituta (in French). 40: 57–90. doi:10.2298/ZRVI0340057C. ISSN 0584-9888. Archived from the original (PDF) on 2011-07-23.
- Kazhdan, Alexander (1991). "Argyros". In Kazhdan, Alexander (ed.). The Oxford Dictionary of Byzantium. New York and Oxford: Oxford University Press. p. 165. ISBN 978-0-19-504652-6.
