= Argiropulos Efendi =

- Born: Ottoman Empire
- Died: 1850; Istanbul, Ottoman Empire
- Occupation: Diplomat

Argiropulos Efendi, also known as Yanko Argiropoulo, Jean Argyropoulos, or Jak Agriopulo Efendi, (?-1850), was an Ottoman Greek diplomat.

== Life ==
In 1797, İsmail Ferruh Efendi was appointed to replace Yusuf Agah Efendi, and both Argiropoulo and his brother Georges were assigned as translators in his entourage. In a letter to his government, the British chargé d'affaires in Istanbul at the time, Spencer Smith, requested that support not be withheld from the Argiropoulo brothers despite their inadequate education, as they came from a respectable family. The Argiropoulo family is said to trace its origins to the Byzantine Empire, specifically the Argyros family. Their father, Manolaki (Emmanuel), was originally a physician but also served as a translator for the Navy and acted as the chief steward to his brother-in-law, Alexandru Moruzi, the Prince of Wallachia.

The Argiropoulo brothers continued to serve under İsmail Ferruh Efendi until the end of his three-year mission. After Ferruh's departure from England, Yanko Argiropoulo, who had held positions as both chief clerk and chief translator, was appointed as chargé d'affaires in London on 11 August 1800 with an annual salary of 20,000 kuruş. He served in London until 1803, when he requested permission to return to Istanbul due to having been away from his family for a long time. Sıdkı Efendi was appointed in his place, and Yanko Argiropoulo departed England on 24 November 1803.

Although Yanko Argiropoulo was appointed as chargé d'affaires to Berlin in November 1805, he did not leave Istanbul until the following March, officially presenting his credentials on 9 May 1806. Shortly afterward, French troops entered Berlin, negatively affecting diplomatic relations between Prussia and the Ottoman Empire. In mid-1807, before the Treaty of Tilsit, the Prussian ambassador Baron Senfft von Pilsach, who had arrived in Istanbul, was refused audience at the request of France and asked to return to his country. Prussia, rejecting this stance by the Sublime Porte, decided to close its embassy in Istanbul. Accordingly, Argiropoulo’s diplomatic mission also ended.

Argiropoulo was then appointed chargé d'affaires to Vienna, replacing Konstantin Dibalto, and served until 1811. However, due to claims of inadequacy in maintaining diplomatic relations, he was dismissed at the request of the Austrian embassy in Istanbul.

During the Greek War of Independence, he was exiled along with his brother. He died in Istanbul in 1850.

== Official Appointments ==
The following are among his various administrative positions:

- London Embassy (1800–1803)
- Berlin Embassy (1806–1807)
- Vienna Embassy (1808–1811)
