= Michail Grigoriadis =

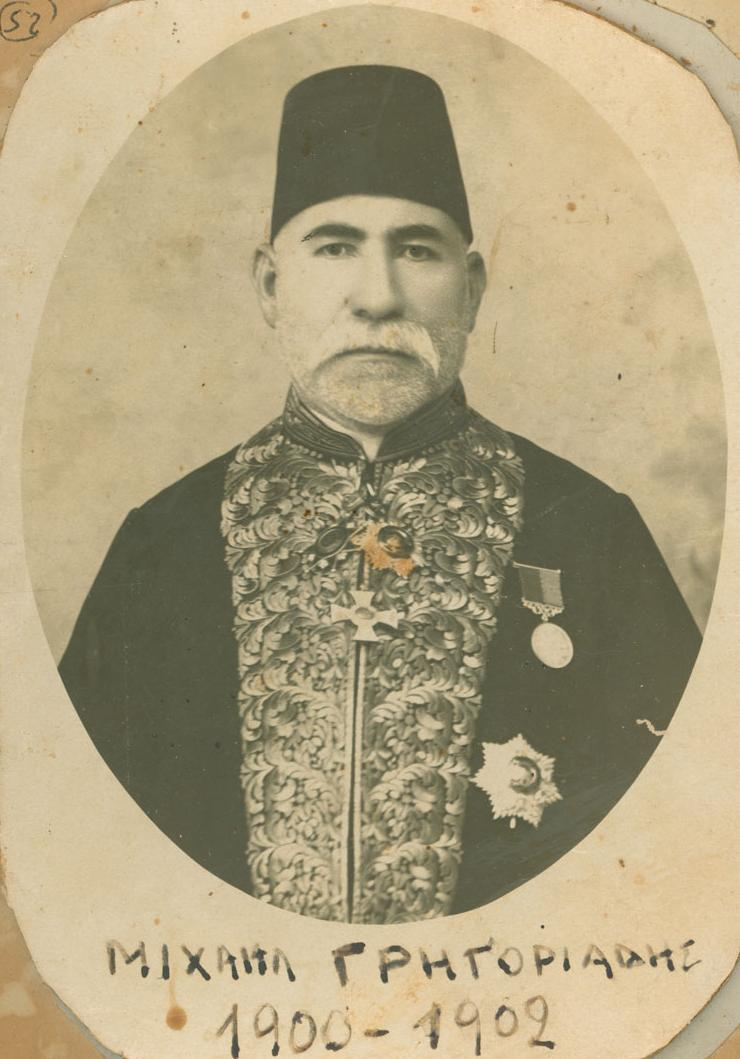

Prince of Samos
- In office 1900–1902
- Preceded by: Konstantinos Vagianis
- Succeeded by: Alexandros Mavrogenis

Personal details
- Born: 1841
- Died: Unknown

Michail Grigoriadis was the Ottoman-appointed Prince of Samos from 1900 to 1902.

An incompetent prince, he achieved very little during his reign and was dismissed by the Ottoman Sultan after a reign of only two years.
