= Konstantinos Vagianis =

Prince of Samos (1846–1919)

Konstantinos Vagianis (Vayanis Éfendi)
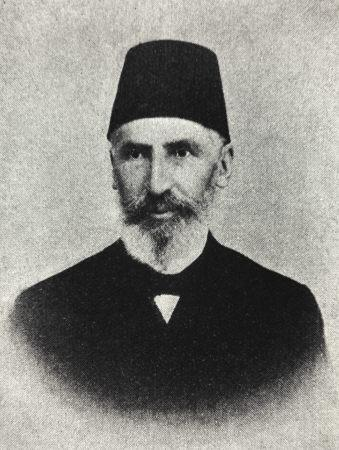

Prince of Samos
- In office 1899–1900
- Preceded by: Stephanos Mousouros
- Succeeded by: Michail Grigoriadis

Personal details
- Born: 1846 Neapolis, Ottoman Empire
- Died: 1919 (aged 72–73)

Konstantinos Vagianis or Kostaki Vayanis Éfendi (1846 – 1919) was a Prince of Samos between March 7, 1899, and 1900. He succeeded Stephanos Mousouros and was in turn succeeded by Michail Grigoriadis on August 16, 1900.

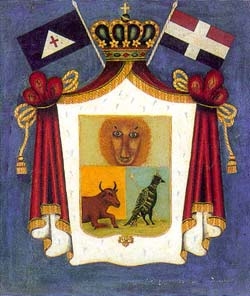
Princely coat of arms

He came from Neapolis in Cappadocia. He studied law in Constantinople and Athens. He became a professor of merchant law in Constantinople and appointed counselor to the Ecumenical Patriarchate of Constantinople. His sister was Princess Arapissas Vayanis, Countess Nissirios. His reign as Prince of Samos was largely a failure because he adhered to only one political party.

While at first he was beloved the Greek population of the island and loved them in turn, but he later on forbade the Samian National Anthem and the Samian National Flag. He even dismissed a mayor because he protested strongly about that.

Despite the privileges and rights of the people of the Principality of Samos, he tried to persuade the Ottoman Sultan to abolish the decisions of the former Parliament. For this reason, the Parliament asked for his replacement, to which the Sultan consented.
