= Archontopouloi =

Byzantine regiment

The archontopouloi (Greek: Ἀρχοντόπουλοι) were an elite military formation of the Byzantine army during the Komnenian era, in the 11th-12th centuries. They were founded by Emperor Alexios I Komnenos (r. 1081–1118) as part of his military reforms and were recruited among the orphans of Byzantine officers who were killed in battle.

== History ==
During the Seljuq invasion of Byzantine Asia Minor after the Battle of Manzikert (1071), there were increased numbers of orphaned children; this led Emperor Alexios I Komnenos (r. 1081–1118) to initiate rescue efforts. In c. 1090, while involved in a war against the Pechenegs, Alexios recruited some of these orphans, drawn from the children of the Byzantine officers who had died in battle, and armed and trained to form an elite 2,000-strong cavalry unit, known as the archontopouloi, the "sons of the archons (leaders)".

The archontopouloi are considered to be the only Byzantine orphan care institution directly influenced by ancient Greek policies. Although Alexios's daughter and biographer, Anna Komnene, compared her father's archontopouloi to a Spartan institution, the better documented Athenian tradition to aid the children of deceased warriors was the probable inspiration for Alexios. The Byzantinist John Birkenmeier sees the archontopouloi as being primarily a 'palace officer-training corps', and their deployment as a field regiment by Alexios I as an isolated expedient.

The regiment suffered 300 casualties during a battle at Chariopolis against the Pechenegs. The archontopouloi regiment disappears from Byzantine sources after the death of Alexios in 1118. However, people termed archontopouloi continue to be recorded later in Byzantine history. The later archontopouloi appear to have belonged to two perhaps related groups. The first group consists of young aristocrats attached to the Byzantine imperial court who may have had a military function, and the second group consists of a type of provincial "pronoiar", an elite soldier who held an imperial land-grant in return for military service. The latter group were possibly recruited from the former, following their training at the imperial court.

== See also ==
- Byzantine army (Komnenian era)
- Twelve noble families of Crete

== Sources ==
- Bartusis, Mark C. (1997). The Late Byzantine Army: Arms and Society 1204–1453. Philadelphia, Pennsylvania: University of Pennsylvania Press. ISBN 0-8122-1620-2.
- Birkenmeier, John W. (2002). The Development of the Komnenian Army: 1081–1180. Boston, Massachusetts: Brill. ISBN 90-04-11710-5.
- Kühn, Hans-Joachim (1991). Die byzantinische Armee im 10. und 11. Jahrhundert: Studien zur Organisation der Tagmata (in German). Vienna: Fassbaender Verlag. ISBN 3-9005-38-23-9.
- Miller, Timothy S. (2003). The Orphans of Byzantium: Child Welfare in the Christian Empire. Washington, DC: Catholic University of America. ISBN 0-8132-1313-4.
