= Twelve noble families of Crete =

Greek origin legend

The twelve noble families of Crete or Twelve Archontopoula (Greek: Δώδεκα Αρχοντόπουλα) is a legend ascribing the origin of the most prominent families of the Cretan nobility to a settlement of twelve scions of noble families of Constantinople on the island by a Byzantine emperor.

== Documentary basis of the legend ==
The legend of the Twelve Archontopoula survives in six different documents in several versions, both in Greek and in Italian, which were collected in the 1900s by the German Byzantinist Ernst Gerland (Histoire de la noblesse crétoise au Moyen Âge). One of the documents purports to be a charter, dated to the year 1182, claiming that the Emperor "Alexios Komnenos the porphyrogennetos" sent his son Isaac to rule over Crete after a rebellion in the island, as well as twelve noble families as his aides and lieutenants. Isaac and the heads of the twelve families sign the document. The facts however do not fit the date: Emperor Alexios II Komnenos, who ruled in 1182, was indeed a porphyrogennetos, but was murdered in 1183 at only fifteen years of age, and did not have any offspring. Nor is a Cretan revolt known during his rule. As a result, Gerlach suggested that the events refer to the revolt of Karykes in 1092, under Alexios I Komnenos, but the latter was not a porphyrogennetos, and his son Isaac was only born in 1093. The document is thus clearly a forgery, created after the conquest of Crete by the Republic of Venice early in the 13th century, with the aim of protecting the social position and privileges of the local magnate families named in the document.

A second document concerns the restoration or confirmation of previously donated pronoia lands to the Skordyles family, one of the twelve mentioned in the first document, by the governor of Crete, Constantine Doukas. The various sons of the Skordyles clan are mentioned, each with his own sobriquet, apparently in an effort, according to the French Byzantinist Charles Brand, "to provide each of the existent sub-clans or affiliated families of the Skordyloi with an eponymous ancestor". It is purportedly dated to 1183 (although Gerland dated it to 1191), and its authenticity is debated among modern scholars, with some considering that it derives from a genuine document. This, and the term 'Archontopoula' ('sons of the lords', or 'sons of the commanders'), which is used throughout in the legend, may point to a historical basis: Emperor Alexios I created a special military unit out of orphaned sons of officers, called Archontopouloi, and it may be that the later noble families trace their descent to soldiers invested with pronoia lands, i.e., estates in exchange for military service. At the very least, both documents attest that in the late 12th century there were large land-holding families in Crete, a hereditary landed aristocracy that had emerged as imperial authority declined, much like elsewhere in the Byzantine world of time.

The term archondopoulo became so established that it was used by the Venetians to refer to the native Greek nobility. Travellers in later centuries report that the local Greek aristocracy insisted on their descent "from the nobles of the Empire of Constantinople". In 1415, when the Florentine humanist Cristoforo Buondelmonti visited Crete, the legend of the Twelve Archontopoula was well-established, and narrated to him by a Cretan Orthodox priest.

== Families ==
=== Phokas ===
The Phokas (Φωκᾶς) family is represented in the supposed charter of 1182 by John Phokas, who is at the head of all three extant versions of the document. The surname still appears in the 15th century, but the most famous branch of the family is the extensive Kallergis clan, the leading family of the native Greek Orthodox nobility. The Kallergis eventually claimed descent from the Byzantine Phokas family, and its most famous representative, Nikephoros II Phokas. Nikephoros II Phokas had led the reconquest of Crete from the Saracens in 961, and appears in a number of later legends about the island's Byzantine past.

=== Varouchas ===
Constantine Varouchas (Βαρούχας) is mentioned in second place in the charter of 1182. The family is otherwise attested during the Revolt of Alexios Kallergis in the 1280s and in inscriptions afterwards.

=== Skordyles ===
The Skordyles or Skordylis (Σκορδύλης) were one of the most prominent families of the native Cretan nobility, subdivided in numerous branches. In the charter of 1182, they are represented by Marinos Skordyles, located in third place in two of the documents and fifth in the other. In historical sources they are attested already in 1212–1213, when Constantine Sebastos Skordyles launched a rebellion against Venetian rule.

=== Mousouros ===
In the charter of 1182, Leo Mousouros appears in fourth place in two of the documents and sixth in the other. Although they claimed thus to be one of the most ancient families on the island, the Mousouroi (Μούσουρος or Μουσοῦρος) are ill attested in later historical or epigraphical sources. Their most famous member was likely the Renaissance humanist Marcus Musurus.

=== Gavalas ===
In the charter of 1182, Philip Gavalas appears in fifth place in two of the documents and third in the other. The Gavalas (Γαβαλᾶς) are attested since the late 13th century and well into the 15th century.

=== Melissenos ===
The Melissenos or Melissinos (Μελισσηνός) family is represented in the charter of 1182 by Andreas Melissenos, in sixth place. Members of the family are attested in uprisings against Venice as early as 1217 and 1222. 'Melissenos' was a common surname in the late medieval Greek world, thus the membership to the Cretan branch of the family of people bearing that name and active outside Crete is often uncertain.

=== Arkoleos ===
The family name is variously given as Arkoleos (Ἀρκολέος) or Archoleos (Ἀρχόλεος, Ἀρχολέος) in the charter of 1182, where Thomas Arkoleos is placed seventh (fourth in one version). The family is attested in a charter of 1234, granted by the Venetian Duke of Candia, and survived at least until the 16th century.

=== Vlastos ===
The Vlastos (Βλαστός) family is represented by Demetrios Vlastos in eighth place in the charter of 1182. It is first attested participating in the Revolt of Alexios Kallergis, and well into the 16th century; most notable is the failed Conspiracy of Sifis Vlastos in 1454.

=== Chortatzes ===
The Chortatses (Χορτάτσης) or Chortatzes (Χορτάτζης) family led several revolts against Venice in the 13th century, and is attested into the 16th century. In the charter of 1182, Eustathios (or Eustrateios) Chortatzes (or Chortatses) is mentioned, in ninth place.

=== Argyropoulos ===
The Argyropoulos (Ἀργυρόπουλος) family is not well attested but one of its branches, the Agiostephanites (Ἀγιοστεφανίτης), who organized the first revolt against Venice in 1212. In the charter of 1182, Nikephoros Argyropoulos is already surnamed Hagiostephanites.

=== Lithinos ===
Loukas Litinos (Λίτινος) or Lithinos (Λίθινος, Λιθινός) is mentioned in penultimate (last in one version) place in the charter of 1182.

=== Ka(la)phates ===
Matthew Kaphates (Καφάτης), Kalaphates (Καλαφάτης), or Kaphatos (Καφάτος) is mentioned in twelfth, eleventh, and tenth place in the various versions of the 1182 charter.

== Sources ==
- Bancroft-Marcus, Rosemary (1991). "The Pastoral Mode". In Holton, David (ed.). Literature and Society in Renaissance Crete. Cambridge: Cambridge University Press. pp. 79–102. ISBN 0-521-32579-X.
- Brand, Charles M. (1968). Byzantium Confronts the West, 1180–1204. Cambridge, Massachusetts: Harvard University Press. LCCN 67-20872.
- Detorakis, Theocharis E. (1986). Ιστορία της Κρήτης [History of Crete] (in Greek). Athens. OCLC 715204595.
- Gerland, Ernst (1907). Histoire de la noblesse crétoise au Moyen Âge (in French). Paris: Ernest Leroux., comprises the following works:
  - Gerland, Ernst (1905). "Histoire de la noblesse crétoise au Moyen Âge". Revue de l'Orient Latin (in French). X. Paris: Ernest Leroux: 172–247.
  - Gerland, Ernst (1908). "Histoire de la noblesse crétoise au Moyen Âge". Revue de l'Orient Latin (in French). XI. Paris: Ernest Leroux: 7–144.
- Maltezou, Chryssa (1991). "The Historical and Social Context". In Holton, David (ed.). Literature and Society in Renaissance Crete. Cambridge: Cambridge University Press. pp. 17–48. ISBN 0-521-32579-X.
- Maltezou, Chryssa (1998). "Byzantine Legends in Venetian Crete". In Ševcenko, Ihor; Hutter, Irmgard (eds.). ᾿Αετός. Studies in honour of Cyril Mango presented to him on April 14, 1998. Stuttgart and Leipzig: B. G. Teubner. pp. 233–242. doi:10.1515/9783110958614.233.
- Tsougarakis, Dimitris (1988). Byzantine Crete: From the 5th Century to the Venetian Conquest. Athens: Historical Publications St. D. Basilopoulos. ISBN 960-7100-04-2.
- Varzos, Konstantinos (1984). Η Γενεαλογία των Κομνηνών [The Genealogy of the Komnenoi] (PDF) (in Greek). Vol. A1. Thessaloniki: Centre for Byzantine Studies, University of Thessaloniki.
