= Rüstem Mariani =

Ottoman diplomat (1810–1895)

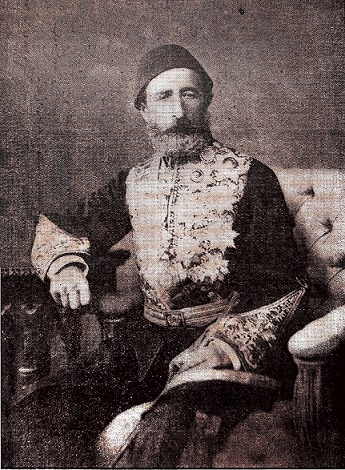
- Rüstem Mariani Pasha
- Born: 1810; Florence, Italy
- Died: 1895 (aged 84–85); London, England

Seal

Rüstem Mariani, also known as Rüstem Mariani Pasha, Rüstem Pasha, Rostem Pasha (Ottoman Turkish: رستم مارياني باشا; 1810–1895), was an Ottoman diplomat, and the third Mutasarrif of Mount Lebanon.

== Early life ==
Rüstem was born in 1810 in an Italian Latin Catholic family, Chimelli di Marini, in Florence or Istanbul. His paternal lineage is believed to have noble roots, with connections to the Ottoman Dynasty. Rüstem received quality education, but his father lost the family wealth and died at a young age.

== Career ==
=== Diplomacy ===
He started his diplomatic career in 1848 as secretary and assistant to Mehmed Fuad Pasha in his special mission to settle the provinces of Moldavia and Wallachia, "the Danubian Principalities” , in modern day Romania, at that time occupied by Russian troops. In 1854 he was again similarly employed, with Fuad Pasha, in the pacification of Epirus and Thessaly, after which he was appointed Secretary-General at the Foreign Office. During fourteen years, from 1856, he represented the Ottoman Empire at the Court of King Victor Emmanuel in Italy, at Turin, at Florence, and at Rome, also served as ambassador to the Russian Empire in Saint Petersburg. to the United Kingdom in London

=== Governor ===
Rüstem was promoted to the rank of vizier and appointed governor of Mount Lebanon by the imperial decrees in 1873 for a term of ten years where he lowered the dissensions of race and creed between the Mussulman Druse and Maronite populations.

== Later years and death ==
In 1885, at 75 years old, he succeeded Musurus Pasha as ambassador in London. He died during the night of 19-20 November 1895 at the Turkish Embassy in Bryanston Square. His funeral was held according to the rites of the Roman Catholic religion at St. James's Church, Manchester Square, by Cardinal Herbert Alfred Vaughan, and was buried at St Mary’s catholic cemetery in Kensal Green Cemetery; his grave, still present nowadays, is the number 2763

== Personal life ==
Rüstem never married.
