= Constantine Anthopoulos =

Ottoman Greek academic and statesman (1835–1902)

Costaki Anthopoulos Pasha
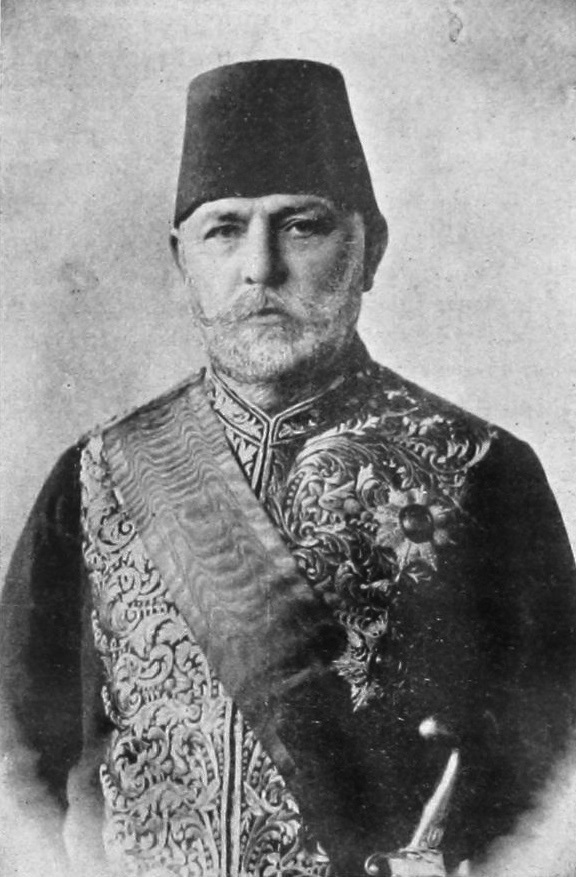

Personal details
- Born: 1835 Constantinople, Ottoman Empire (now Istanbul, Turkey)
- Died: 1902 (aged 66–67)

Costaki Anthopoulos (Greek: Κωστάκης Ανθόπουλος, Turkish: Kostaki Antopulos Paşa; 1835–1902), was an Ottoman Greek academic and statesman.

== Life ==
He became a professor at the Ottoman Naval Academy; then entered the legal branch of the Turkish service, rising to the post of imperial procurator at the court of cassation. He was governor-general of Crete; and, in 1895, was appointed Ottoman ambassador in London, a post which he continued to hold until his death at Constantinople in 1902.

He bore throughout his career the reputation of an intelligent and upright public servant.

In June 1902, the Sultan conferred on him the decoration Nisan-i Iftihar (Order of Glory) in diamonds, in recognition of the loyal services rendered by him to the Ottoman Empire.
