= Leo Argyros (9th century) =

Leo Argyros (Greek: Λέων Ἀργυρός) was a Byzantine aristocrat and general active in the middle of the 9th century, and the founder of the noble family of the Argyroi.

== Life ==
Leo Argyros is the first attested member and progenitor of the Argyros family, although it has been suggested on the basis of the family's onomastics that it descended from a certain patrikios Marianos and his son Eustathios, active ca. 741.

Leo Argyros hailed from the area of Charsianon, and served as a tourmarches under Emperor Michael III (reigned 842–867). He participated in the pogrom of 843 against the Paulicians, and distinguished himself in the border wars against the Arabs and their Paulician allies. He also founded the monastery of Saint Elizabeth in his native Charsianon, where he was probably buried. He had at least one son, the general Eustathios Argyros.

== Sources ==
- Cheynet, J.-C.; Vannier, J.-F. (2003). "Les Argyroi". Zbornik Radova Vizantološkog Instituta (in French). 40: 57–90. doi:10.2298/ZRVI0340057C. ISSN 0584-9888.
- Kazhdan, Alexander (1991). "Argyros". In Kazhdan, Alexander (ed.). The Oxford Dictionary of Byzantium. Oxford and New York: Oxford University Press. p. 165. ISBN 0-19-504652-8.
