= Konstantinos Mousouros =

Diplomat of the Ottoman Empire

Kostaki Musurus Pasha
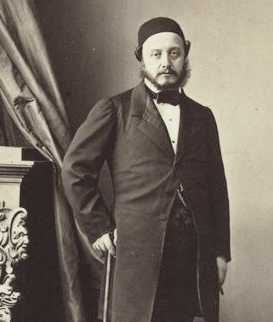

Ambassador of the Ottoman Empire to the Austrian Empire
- In office 1848–1850

Ambassador of the Ottoman Empire to the United Kingdom
- In office 1851–1885

Ambassador of the Ottoman Empire to the Netherlands
- In office 1861–1875

Personal details
- Born: 18 February 1807 Constantinople, Ottoman Empire
- Died: 10 February 1891 (aged 83) Constantinople, Ottoman Empire
- Spouse: Princess Anne Vogoridaina
- Relations: Grégoire Bibesco-Bassaraba (son in law); Anna de Noailles (granddaughter)
- Children: Stephanos Mousouros; Rakoul Mousourus Bibesco-Bassaraba
- Profession: Ambassador

Konstantinos Mousouros (Greek: Κωνσταντίνος Μουσούρος, Turkish: Kostaki Musurus Paşa; 1807–1891), also known as Kostaki Musurus Pasha, was an Ottoman Greek diplomatic official of the Ottoman Empire who served as ambassador to Greece, Austria, Great Britain, Belgium, and the Netherlands.

== Biography ==
He was born in 1807 in Constantinople (Istanbul) to the distinguished Phanariote Mousouros family. His brother, Pavlos Mousouros, also became a diplomat. Mousouros became the first ambassador of the Ottoman Empire to the newly independent Kingdom of Greece in 1840, a position he kept until 1848. In 1847–48 he was a central figure in the events known as Mousourika (Μουσουρικά), which led to his temporary recall and the breakdown of relations between the two states. On his return to Athens he survived an assassination attempt, leading to his transfer to Vienna. In 1850 he took up the post of Ottoman ambassador to the Great Britain and Ireland, which he kept for 35 consecutive years, until his retirement in 1885. During the same period, he also served as ambassador to the Netherlands (1861–77) and Belgium (1861–75). In 1876–78, he was ex officio a member of the short-lived Senate of the Ottoman Empire.

Well educated, in 1883 Mousouros translated Dante's Divine Comedy into ancient Greek and Turkish.

He was married and had a son, Stephanos Mousouros, who later became Prince of Samos and Ambassador to the United Kingdom. There was also a daughter married in the United Kingdom to Colonel Heriot.

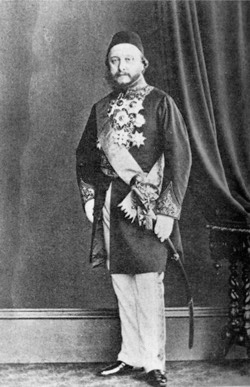
Kostaki Musurus Pasha wearing the diplomatic uniform.

== Honours ==
- Imperial Order of Ottomania; 2nd Class
- Imperials Order of Midjidie, 1st Class.
- Grand Cordon of the Order of Leopold
- Grand Cross in the Order of the Southern Cross
- Grand Cross in the Order of Saints Maurice and Lazarus
- Knight Grand Cross in the Order of the Netherlands Lion
- Grand Commander in the Order of the Redeemer
