= Mousouros family =

The Mousouros (Greek: Μούσουρος or Μουσούρος, pl. Μουσούροι) or Musurus family was a Greek aristocratic family. Hailing from Venetian-ruled Crete, they later became one of the Phanariote families that played a significant role in the foreign affairs of the Ottoman Empire during the 19th century.

== Cretan family ==
The Mousouroi are considered one of the twelve noble families of Crete, which according to tradition were settled on the island by the Byzantine emperors in the 11th or 12th centuries, although this tradition is most likely later invention. In the relevant documents, the family's ostensible founder, Leo Mousouros, appears in fourth or sixth place among the twelve founders. Although the Moousouroi claimed thus to be one of the most ancient families on the island, they are ill attested in later historical or epigraphical sources. Their most famous member was likely the Renaissance humanist Marcus Musurus.

== Ottoman family ==
A branch of the family moved to Constantinople and entered service of the Ottoman Empire as one of the late-period Phanariote families. The most distinguished members of this branch were the descendants of Stefanos Mousouros the Elder:

- Ioannis Mousouros, Ottoman Greek newspaper journalist and editor
- Konstantinos Mousouros, Ottoman ambassador to Greece (1840–1848), Austria (1848–1850), the United Kingdom (1850–1885), the Netherlands (1861–1877) and Belgium (1861–1875)
  - Stephanos Mousouros, Ottoman ambassador to Italy and the United Kingdom, Prince of Samos (1896–1899)
- Pavlos Mousouros, Prince of Samos (1866–1873)

== Sources ==
- Gerland, Ernst (1907). Histoire de la noblesse crétoise au Moyen Âge (in French). Paris: Ernest Leroux.
- Tsougarakis, Dimitris (1988). Byzantine Crete: From the 5th Century to the Venetian Conquest. Athens: Historical Publications St. D. Basilopoulos. ISBN 960-7100-04-2.
