= Stephanos Mousouros =

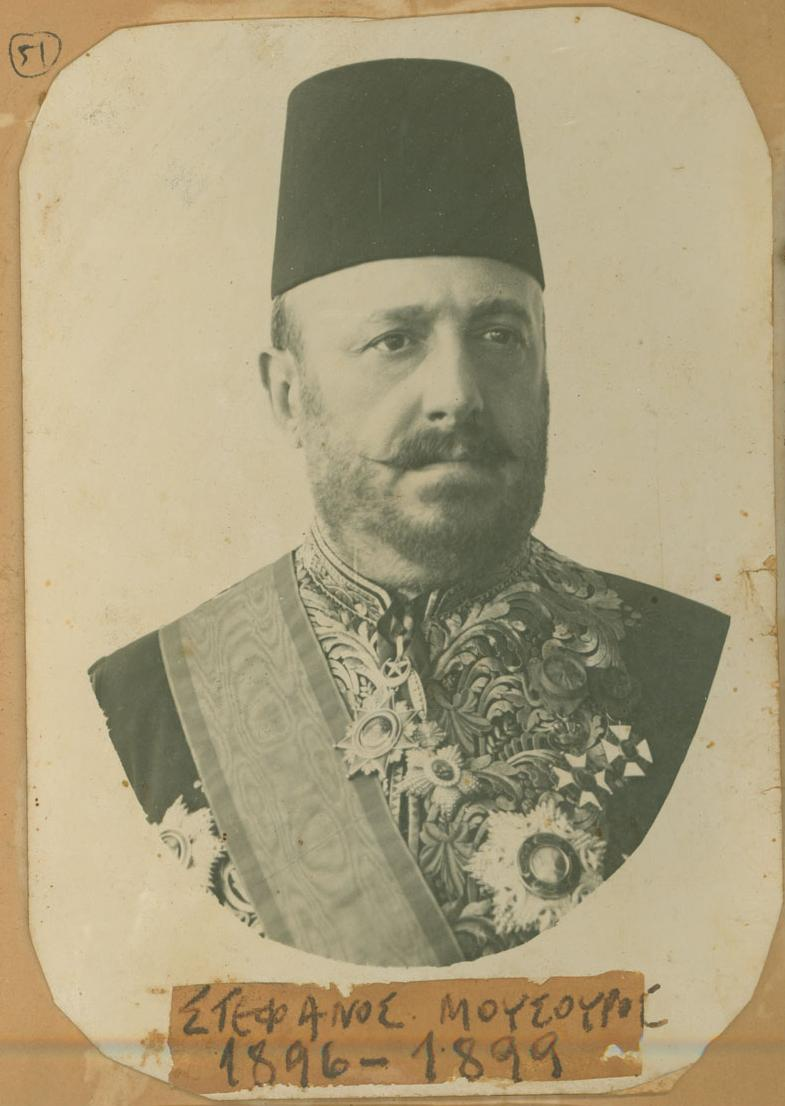

Prince of Samos
- In office 1896–1899
- Preceded by: Georgios Verovits
- Succeeded by: Konstantinos Vagianis

Personal details
- Born: 1841
- Died: 1906
- Spouse: Marie Antonianes

Stephanos Mousouros (1841–1906) was an Ottoman Greek diplomatic official of the Ottoman Empire, who served as ambassador to Italy and the United Kingdom, and was the Ottoman-appointed Prince of Samos from 1896 to 1899.

Mousouros was the grandson of the first Prince of Samos, Stephanos Vogoridis, and the son of Konstantinos Mousouros, governor of Samos for Vogoridis. The Mousouros family was Christian Greek. His father had served as Ottoman ambassador to the United Kingdom for more than 30 years from 1850, and the young Stephanous thus lived in London in the early part of his life, and also served in minor positions at the embassy – first in London, then in Italy and in the public works commission – while receiving the education of a European aristocrat.

He was ambassador of the Ottoman Empire to the Kingdom of Italy, before he was appointed Prince of Samos in 1896. Though he did not want the office. He ruled Samos well, putting the law above everything else. The political factionism on the island decreased. He built the roads connecting Vathi, Karlovasi, Marathokampos, Platanos, Pirgos and the capital.

He became ambassador of the Ottoman Empire to the United Kingdom, where he arrived in January 1903, and presented his credentials to King Edward VII at Windsor Castle, where he was received with his wife on 30 January 1903.

He was married to a Greek lady: Marie Antonianes. Her family were rich banker from Alexandria
