= Ottoman Greeks =

Ethnic Greeks living within the Ottoman Empire

Greco-Ottoman civil ensign

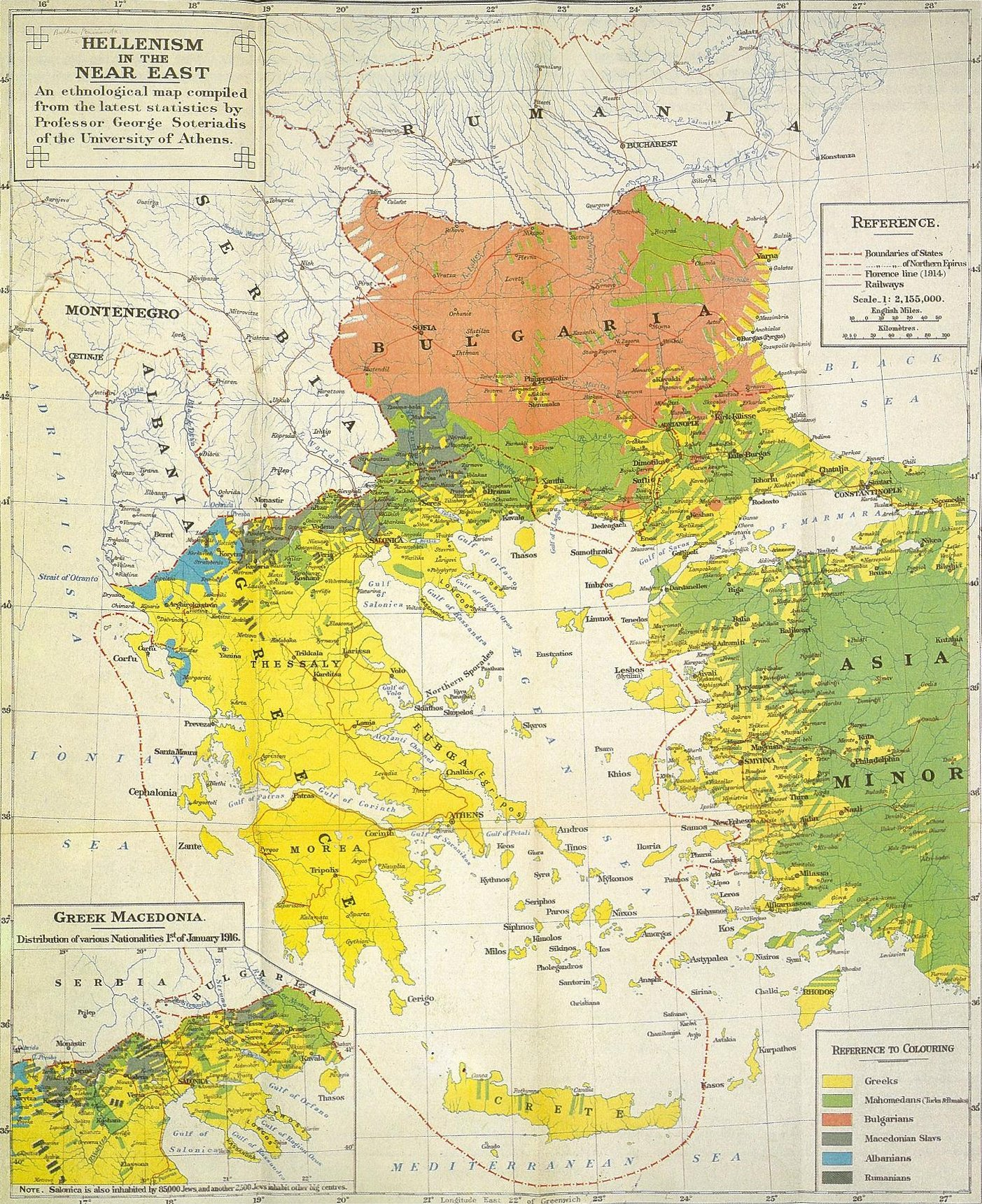
Hellenism (yellow) in the Aegean during and after World War I by George Soteriadis of the University of Athens

Ottoman Greeks (Greek: Γραικοί, romanized: Graikoi) or Romioi (Greek: Ρωμιοί, romanized: Romioi; Turkish: Osmanlı Rumları) were ethnic Greeks who lived in the Ottoman Empire (1299–1922), a large part of which is in modern Turkey, Greece, Cyprus, the Balkans and the Eastern Mediterranean. There were also sizeable Greek communities elsewhere in the Ottoman Armenia, Ottoman Syria and the Ottoman Caucasus, including in what, between 1878 and 1917, made up the Russian Caucasus province of Kars Oblast, in which Pontic Greeks, northeastern Anatolian Greeks, and Caucasus Greeks who had collaborated with the Russian Imperial Army in the Russo-Turkish War of 1828–1829 were settled in over 70 villages, as part of official Russian policy to re-populate with Orthodox Christians an area that was traditionally made up of Ottoman Muslims and Armenians.

== History ==
=== Introduction ===
In the Ottoman Empire, in accordance with the Muslim dhimmi system, former Byzantine Greeks who remained Christians were guaranteed limited freedoms (such as the right to worship), but were treated as second-class citizens, as members of the Rum millet. Christians and Jews were not considered equals to Muslims: testimony against Muslims by Christians and Jews was inadmissible in courts of law. They were forbidden to carry weapons or ride atop horses, their houses could not overlook those of Muslims, and their religious practices would have to defer to those of Muslims, in addition to various other legal limitations. Violation of these statutes could result in punishments ranging from the levying of fines to execution.

The Ecumenical Patriarch was recognized as the highest religious and political leader (millet-bashi, or ethnarch) of all Orthodox Christian subjects of the Sultan, though in certain periods some major powers, such as Russia (under the Treaty of Küçük Kaynarca of 1774) or Great Britain, later the United Kingdom, claimed the rights of protection over the Ottoman Empire's Orthodox subjects.

=== 19th century ===
The three major European powers, the United Kingdom, France and Russia (known as the Great Powers), took issue with the Ottoman Empire's treatment of its Christian population and increasingly pressured the Ottoman government (also known as the Sublime Porte) to extend equal rights to all its citizens.

Beginning in 1839, the Ottoman government implemented the Tanzimat reforms to improve the situation of non-Muslims, although these would prove largely ineffective. In 1856, the Hatt-ı Hümayun promised equality for all Ottoman citizens irrespective of their ethnicity and confession, widening the scope of the 1839 Hatt-ı Şerif of Gülhane. The reformist period peaked with the Constitution, (or Kanûn-ı Esâsî in Ottoman Turkish), which was promulgated on November 23, 1876. It established freedom of belief and equality of all citizens before the law.

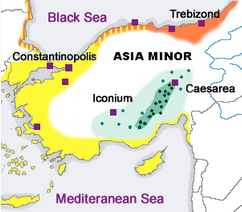
Anatolian Greek dialects until 1923: Demotic in yellow; Pontic Greek in orange; Cappadocian Greek in green, with green dots indicating individual Cappadocian Greek villages in 1910

=== 20th century ===
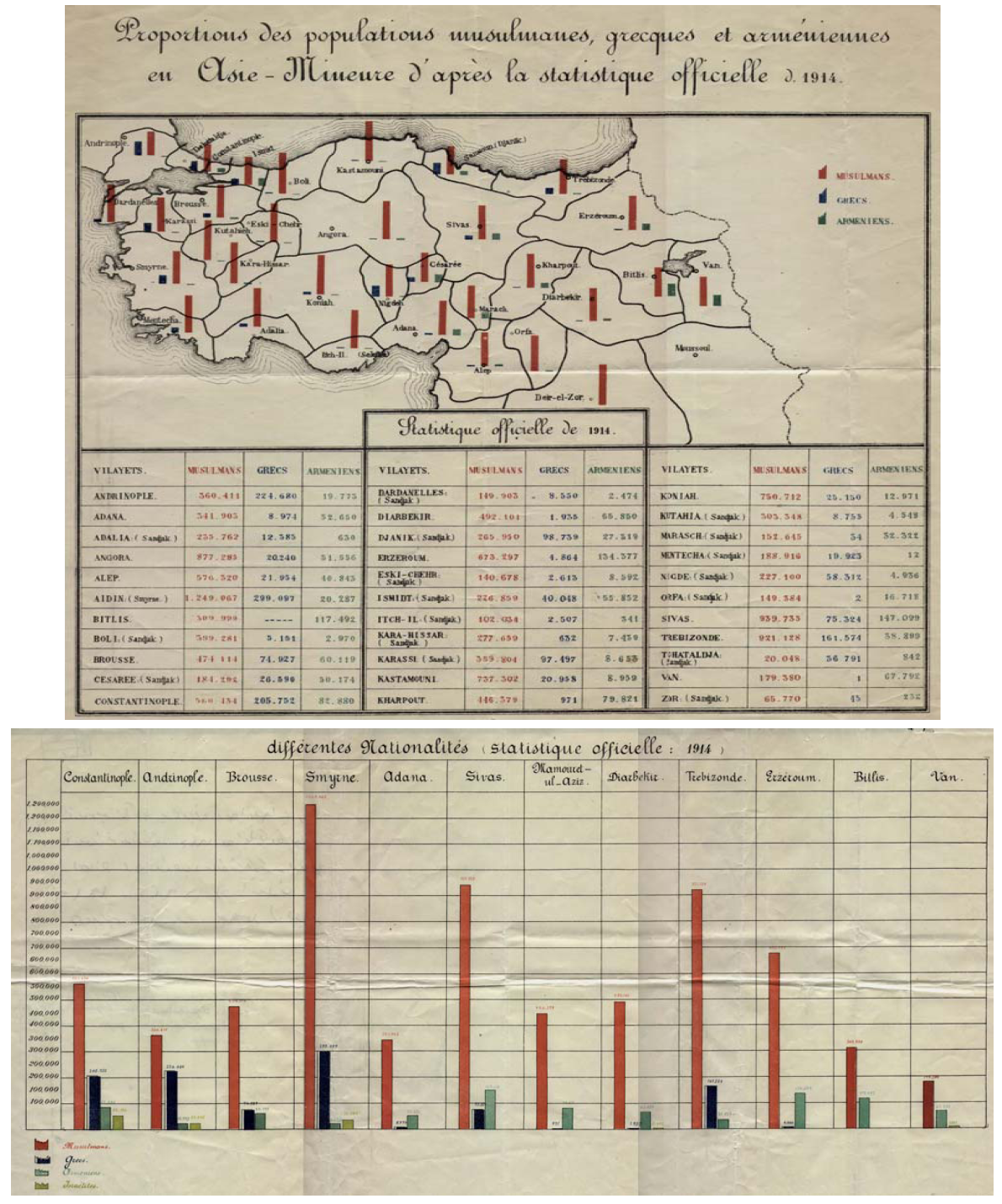
A 1914 document showing the official figures from the 1914 population census of the Ottoman Empire. The total population (sum of all the millets) was given at 20,975,345, and the Greek population was given at 1,792,206.

On July 24, 1908, Greeks' hopes for equality in the Ottoman Empire brightened with the removal of Sultan Abd-ul-Hamid II (r. 1876–1909) from power and restored the country back to a constitutional monarchy. The Committee of Union and Progress (more commonly called the Young Turks), a political party opposed to the absolute rule of Sultan Abd-ul-Hamid II, had led a rebellion against their ruler. The pro-reform Young Turks deposed the Sultan and replaced him with the ineffective Sultan Mehmed V (r. 1908–1918).

Before World War I, there were an estimated 1.8 million Greeks living in the Ottoman Empire. Some prominent Ottoman Greeks served as parliamentary deputies. In the 1908 Parliament, there were twenty-six (26) Ottoman Greek deputies but their number dropped to eighteen (18) by 1914. It is estimated that the Greek population of the Ottoman Empire in Asia Minor had 2,300 community schools, 200,000 students, 5,000 teachers, 2,000 Greek Orthodox churches, and 3,000 Greek Orthodox priests.

From 1914 until 1923, Greeks in Eastern Thrace and Asia Minor were subject to a campaign of massacres and deportations, involving death marches. The International Association of Genocide Scholars (IAGS) recognizes it as genocide and refers to the campaign as the Greek Genocide.

== Rum community in Istanbul ==
The Greek Orthodox Christian community, also called the Rum community, has a rich history in Istanbul. Many members of the Rum community are descendants of the native inhabitants of the city, who lived there well before 330 AD when Istanbul was called Byzantium. The Greek Orthodox community has resided in Istanbul through three different empires: the Roman Empire, the Byzantine Empire, and the Ottoman Empire. The Greek population in Istanbul was especially large in the 19th century, when the city was under Ottoman rule. An 1883 Ottoman census registered 152,741 Greeks in Istanbul. In 1897, an estimated 236,000 Greeks lived in Istanbul and accounted for 22% of the city's population. During the 19th century, the Greek Orthodox community was the largest non-Muslim community in Istanbul. The Rum community prospered and boasted a large population in the capital of the Ottoman Empire.

=== Phanariots ===
Between the 1660s and 1821, during a time of transformation for the Ottoman Empire, an elite group of the Ottoman Greeks, known as the Phanariots, rose to power within the community. While the Ottoman Empire was experiencing internal threats and invasions by the Russian and Habsburg Empires, they developed an "empire within an empire", and contributed to a Greek cultural revival that brought a "national awakening". Within the Ottoman Empire, the Phanariots initiated separation from Ottoman governance on ethnic, national lines. Throughout this transitional time in the Ottoman Empire, the Phanariots grew independently and integrated into the Empire, assisting the Ottoman government in transforming the empire in the midst of modernity. The Phanariots served in European foreign relations, food provision for the capital, provincial governance, and military operations.

The origin of the Phanariots was located in the Phanar quarter of Istanbul, where the Orthodox Patriarchate was located, and continues to be, as well as where Phanariots had their residences and base of power. Phanar was situated in a prime location, near the docks of the Golden Horn, where necessary provisions were brought to Istanbul, and a short boat ride from Topkapi Palace, where the seat of the sultanate was located. Through their commercial activities and rise as local elites in the 17th century, their knowledge of medicine and European languages, and their political relations with the Orthodox church, the Phanariots developed their power. In the 18th century, the Phanariots increased their influence by attaining four exclusive positions of imperial dragoman, dragoman of the fleet, voyvoda of Wallachia, and voyvoda of Moldavia.

=== Rum women in 18th century Istanbul ===
In the late 15th century, the Islamic court of Galata was established, and became one of the most important courts in Istanbul. The court of Galata was the primary seat of justice for the Rum coast. Within 18th century Islamic judicial records of the court of Galata, the documents capture the inheritances of Greek Orthodox Christian women and their increase over time. In 1729, the inheritances of Greek Christian women was 0.7% of total number of cases brought to the Galata court. In 1789, the total number of inheritances cases of Greek Christian women grew to 9.7%. Through analyzed registers, differences in inheritances of Ottoman women during that time become apparent. The married Greek woman, Maryule daughter of Nikola, possessed goods worth 135,600 akçes by the time of her death in 1788, whereas the Muslim widow, Ümmühan daughter of Abdülmalik, owned only 429 akçes by the time of her death in 1729.

=== Rum women in 19th century Istanbul ===
During the 19th century, an Ottoman census did not count women until 1883. The main function of the census was to count male subjects for military conscription and taxation. Thus, Rum women were not included in Ottoman censuses until the late 19th century because women were not included in the military or were not taxed at this time. According to the 1883 census, 60,937 Greek Orthodox women lived in Istanbul. Rum women made up nearly 7% of Istanbul's total population of 873,565 people, although they were not counted in earlier censuses. Like other female subjects of the Ottoman Empire, Rum women were largely excluded from the public sphere in 19th century Istanbul. The Rum community prospered during this century, and Rum men took on important economic and political roles in society. Rum men practiced medicine, law, and trade, while Rum women were excluded from these roles.

Rum women were mainly restricted to the private sphere, although they played a leading role within the home, family, and broader society. The matriarch of a Rum family commanded her household and was treated with respect and obedience by younger relatives. Women exercised considerable authority over their families as the matriarch. Moreover, Rum women benefited from a high level of education during this time period. In the 19th century, the Rum community founded new girls' schools to support women's education. It was typical for a Rum woman to be able to converse in multiple languages, such as French, English, and Italian. Moreover, knowledge of the ancient Greek language was the basis for Rum women's education, so most women were familiar with Greek as well. In 1837, one British traveller even remarked that Rum women pursued higher levels of education than their Turkish and Armenian counterparts in Istanbul. Thus, Rum women received high levels of education in the 19th century and assumed the important role of the matriarch of their families.

== Patriarchate of Constantinople ==
After the fall of Constantinople in 1453, when the Sultan virtually replaced the Byzantine emperor among subjugated Christians, the Ecumenical Patriarch of Constantinople was recognized by the Sultan as the religious and national leader (ethnarch) of the Orthodox population. The Patriarchate earned a primary importance and occupied this key role among the Christians of the Ottoman Empire because the Ottomans did not legally distinguish between nationality and religion, and thus regarded all the Orthodox Christians of the Empire as a single entity.

The position of the Patriarchate in the Ottoman state encouraged projects of Greek renaissance, centered on the resurrection and revitalization of the Byzantine Empire. The Patriarch and those church dignitaries around him constituted the first centre of power for the Greeks inside the Ottoman state, one which succeeded in infiltrating the structures of the Ottoman Empire, while attracting the former Byzantine nobility.

== Lasting identity ==
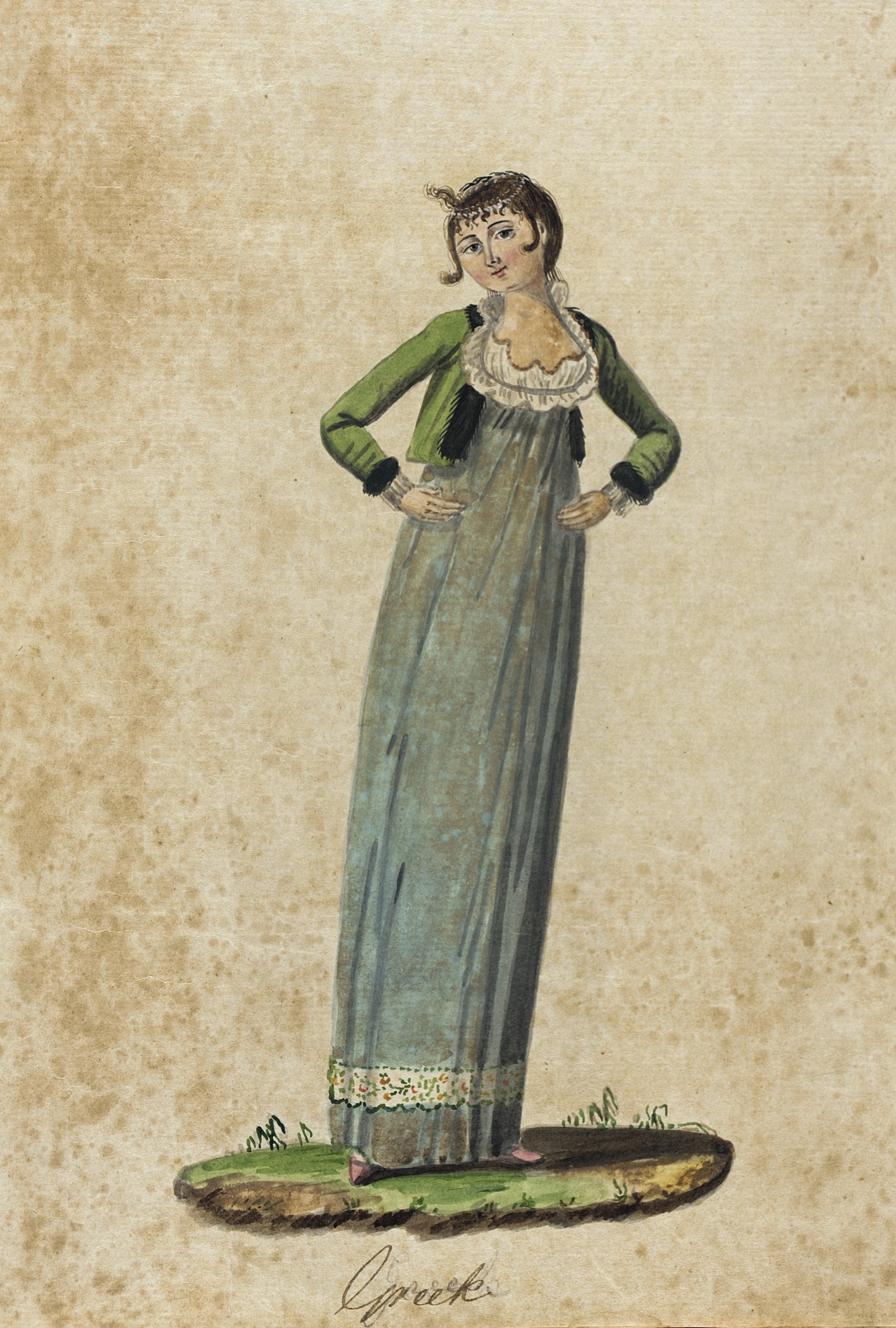
Greek woman in Turkey, 1710

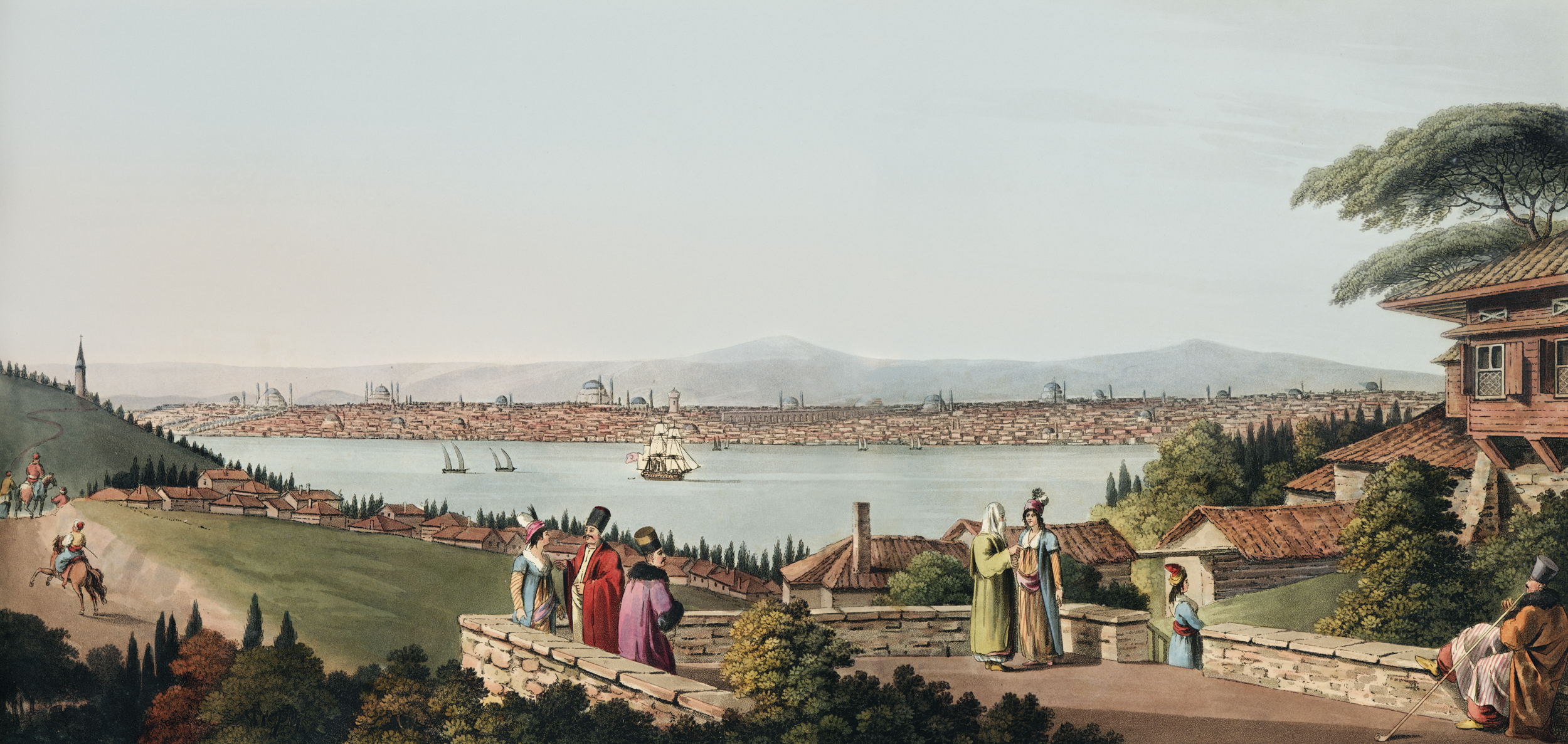
Ottoman Greeks in Constantinople, painted by Luigi Mayer

Under the Ottoman Empire, the Greeks were a self-conscious group within the larger Christian Orthodox religious community. They distinguished themselves from their Orthodox co-religionists by retaining their Greek culture, customs, language, and tradition of education. Throughout the post-Byzantine and Ottoman periods, Greeks, as members of the Ecumenical Patriarchate of Constantinople, declared themselves as Graikoi (Greek: Γραικοί, "Greeks") and Romaioi or Romioi (Greek: Ρωμαίοι/Ρωμηιοί, "Romans").

With the transition from the end of the Ottoman Empire to the creation of the Turkish nation-state, the Rum community has maintained its Greek identity and culture. The community continues to assert its rich history in Istanbul, as the Greek Orthodox community has resided in Istanbul since well before 330 AD. When compared to 19th century population estimates, with as high as 236,000 Rum residents in Istanbul, modern-day estimates appear much lower. Current estimates of the Rum community in Istanbul are around 2,000 people. However, the Rum community continues to celebrate its rich history. The Greek Orthodox Church remains an important pillar of the community and the Church's Ecumenical Patriarch resides in Istanbul. Rum authors like Nektaria Anastasiadou demonstrate how the Rum community is resilient and has retained its vibrant culture.

== Notable Ottoman Greeks ==
- Mimar Sinan (c. 1489 – 1588), Ottoman architect, suggested to have been originally born with the name "Joseph" to Greek parents, and taken by the devşirme system at around the age of 23
- Köse Mihal (d. 1340), companion and general of Osman I
- Nilüfer Hatun (d. 1363), consort of Orhan I
- Evrenos (d. 1417), Ottoman military commander
- Gülçiçek Hatun (1389–1400), consort of Ottoman Sultan Murad I and Valide Hatun to their son Bayezid I
- Demetrios Palaiologos (1407–1470), brother of the last Byzantine emperor Constantine XI Palaiologos; surrendered to Mehmed II in 1460
- Hass Murad Pasha (d. 1473), Ottoman Greek statesman
- Mesih Pasha (1443–1501), Ottoman Grand Vizier, Kapudan Pasha of the Ottoman Navy and statesman
- Gennadius Scholarius (1400–1472), Ecumenical Patriarch of Constantinople
- Rum Mehmed Pasha (d. 1470), Grand Vizier
- Michael Critobulus (d. 1470), scholar and historian
- Manuel Palaiologos (1455 – c. 1513), nephew of Constantine XI Palaiologos; fled to Italy in 1460, but returned to Constantinople in 1476
- Pargalı Ibrahim Pasha (1494–1536), Grand Vizier to Suleyman the Magnificent
- Hadım Suleiman Pasha (1467–1547), Grand Vizier
- Kösem Sultan (1589–1651), wife of Ottoman sultan Ahmed I and valide sultan to their sons Murat IV and Ibrahim I
- Gülnuş Sultan (1642–1715), the Haseki Sultan of Mehmed IV and valide sultan to their sons Mustafa II and Ahmed III
- Nicholas Mavrocordatos (1670–1730), Grand Dragoman
- Adamantios Korais (1748–1833), Greek humanist scholar
- Prince Alexander Mavrocordatos (1791–1865), Greek statesman
- Ibrahim Edhem Pasha (1819–1893), Grand Vizier
- Alexander Karatheodori Pasha (1833–1906), Ottoman-Greek statesman and diplomat
- Basil Zaharoff (1850–1936), arms dealer and financier
- Christakis Zografos (1820–1896), banker and benefactor
- Evangelinos Misailidis (1820–1890), Ottoman writer and journalist
- Hüseyin Hilmi Pasha (1855–1922), Grand Vizier
- Michael Vasileiou, 19th century merchant and benefactor
- Alexandros Mavrogenis (1845–1929), Prince of Samos
- Stephanos Mousouros (1841–1906), was an Ottoman Greek ambassador of the Ottoman Empire to Italy and the United Kingdom, and was the Ottoman-appointed Prince of Samos
- Constantine Anthopoulos (1835–1902), pasha
- Konstantinos Mousouros (1807–1891), Ottoman pasha and ambassador
- Georgios Kourtoglou (1856–1912), Ottoman Pasha, governor and member of the Ottoman parliament
- Pavlos Karolidis (1849–1930), member of the Ottoman parliament
- Yorgo Zarifi (1810–1884), banker and financier
- Leonidas Paraskevopoulos (1860–1936), Greek military man and politician
- Philip Photius Constantine Zaphiro (1879–1933), British Vice Consul and Oriental Secretary to Ethiopia
- Kostas Skarvelis (1880–1942), singer
- Matthaios Kofidis (1855–1921), businessman and politician
- Aristotle Onassis (1906–1975), shipping magnate
- Anton Christoforidis (1918–1985), Greek light heavyweight boxer
- Sir Alec Issigonis (1906–1988), Greek–British car designer whose most famous work is the Mini
- Elia Kazan (1909–2003), director, producer, writer and actor
- Elias Venezis (1904–1973), writer from Ayvalık
- Rita Abatzi (1914–1969), singer
- Giorgos Seferis (1900–1971), Greek poet who was awarded the Nobel Prize in Literature
- Marika Ninou (1918–1957), singer
- Giannis Papaioannou (1913–1972), singer

== Gallery ==
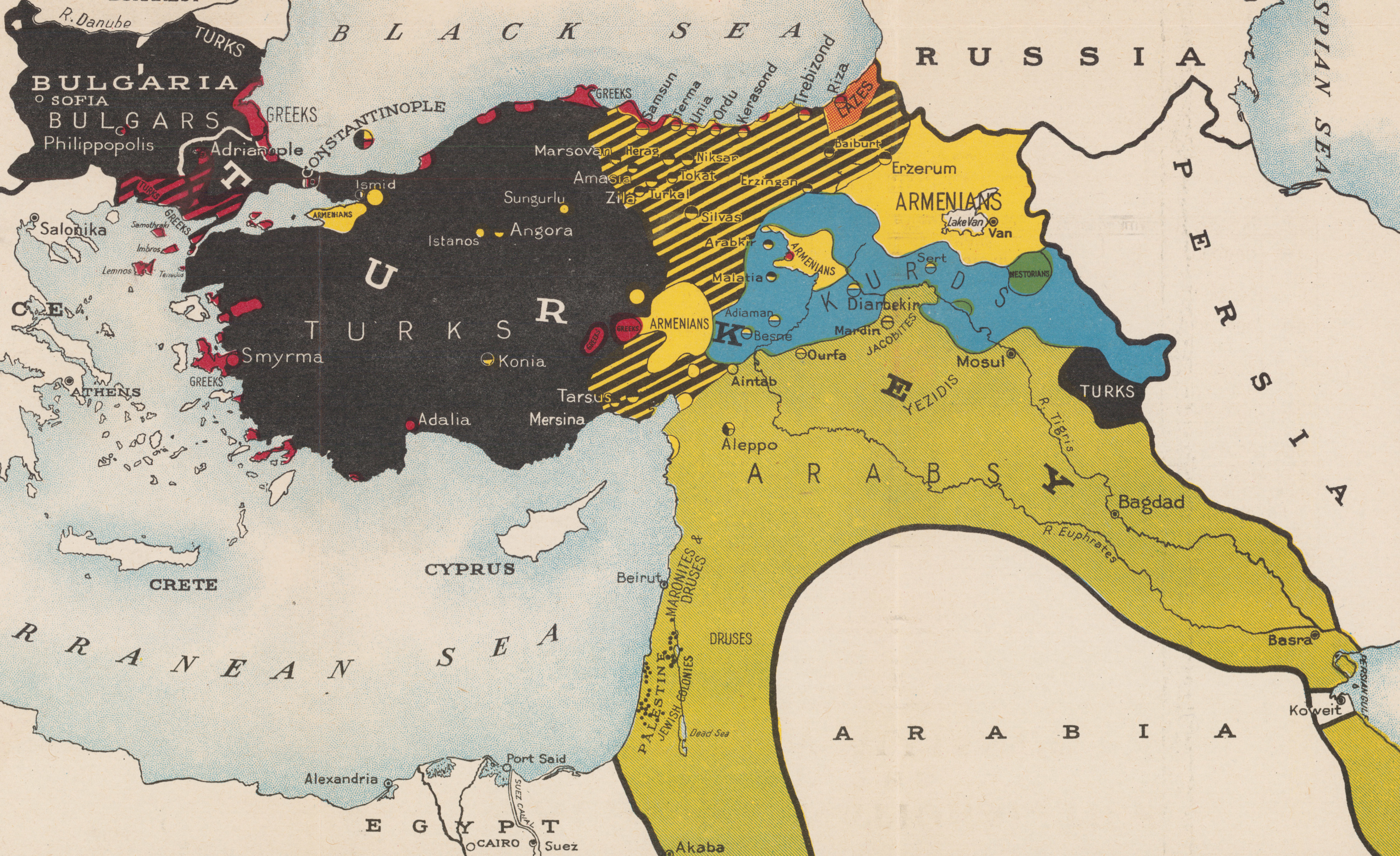
Ethnic map of Asia Minor in 1917. Black = Bulgars and Turks. Red = Greeks. Light yellow = Armenians. Blue = Kurds. Orange = Lazes. Dark Yellow = Arabs. Green = Nestorians

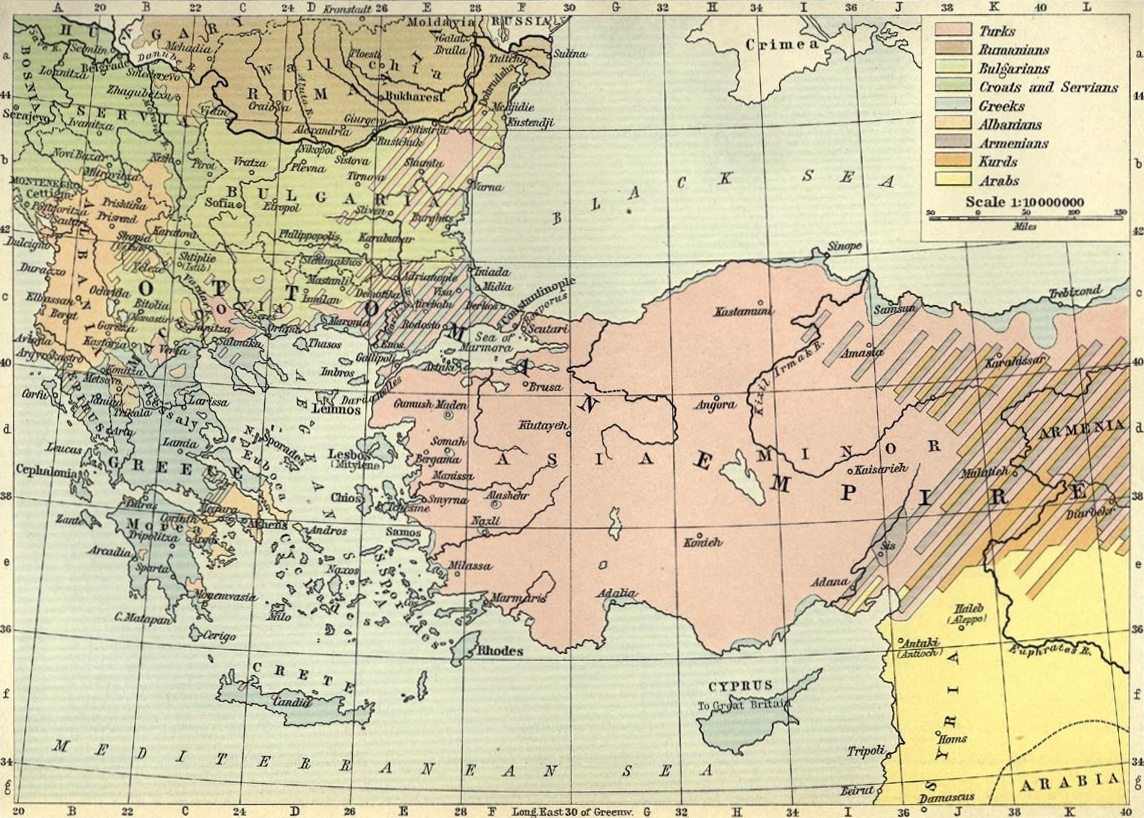
Map depicting the ethnic composition of Ottoman territories in 1911

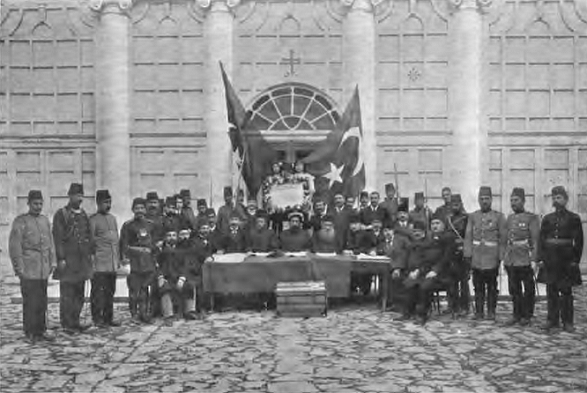
Declaration of the Constitution; Muslim, Greek and Armenian leaders together

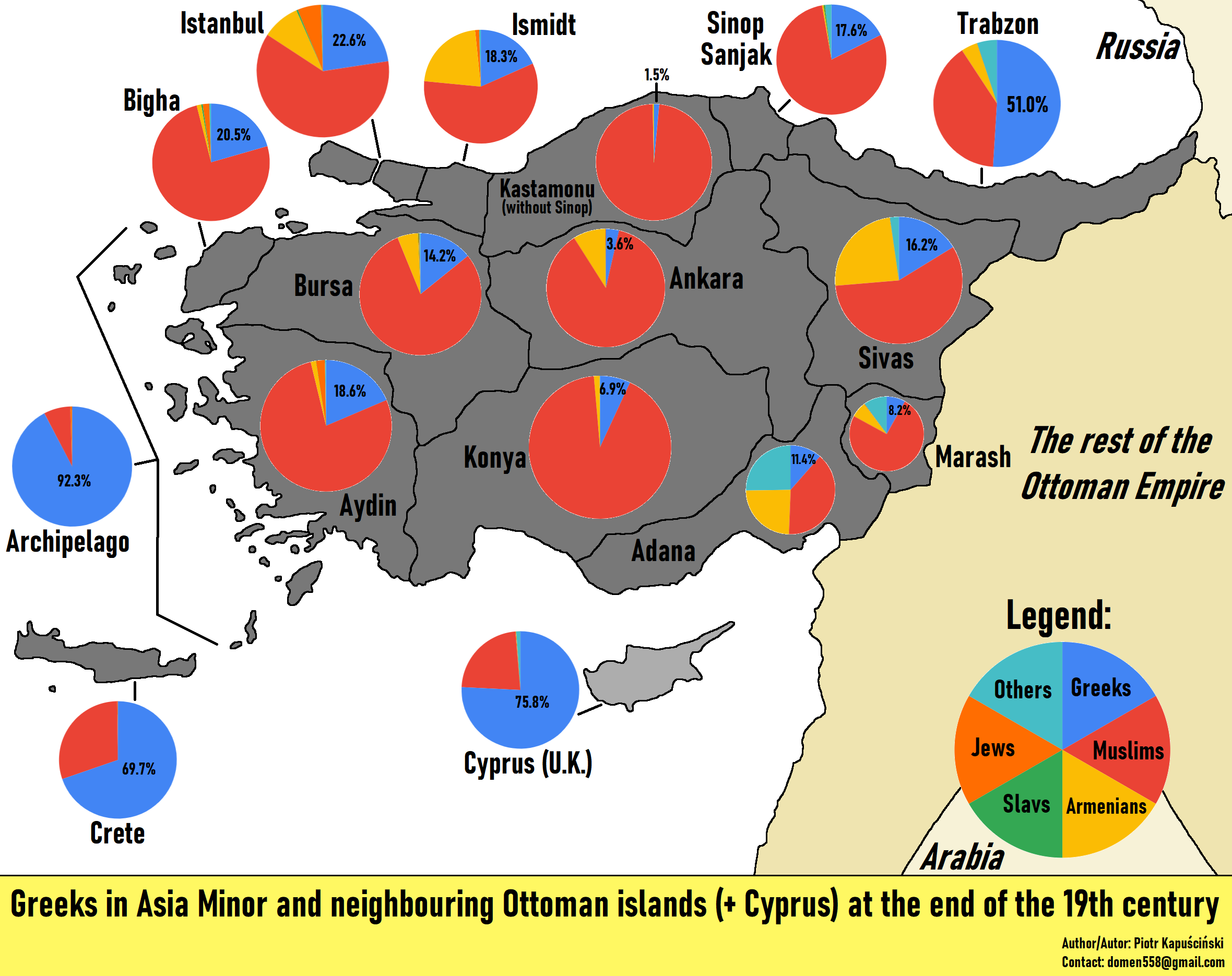
Distribution of ethnic Greek population in Anatolia at the end of the 19th century

== See also ==
- Greeks in Turkey
- Greek resistance during the Greek genocide
- List of Thracian Greeks
- Greek Muslims
- Cretan Muslims
- Ottoman Serbs
- Phanar Greek Orthodox College
- Timeline of Orthodoxy in Greece (1453–1821)
- Greek Byzantine Catholic Church
- List of former mosques in Greece
- History of the Jews in the Ottoman Empire
