= Law of the Ottoman Empire =

Overview of the laws of the Ottoman Empire

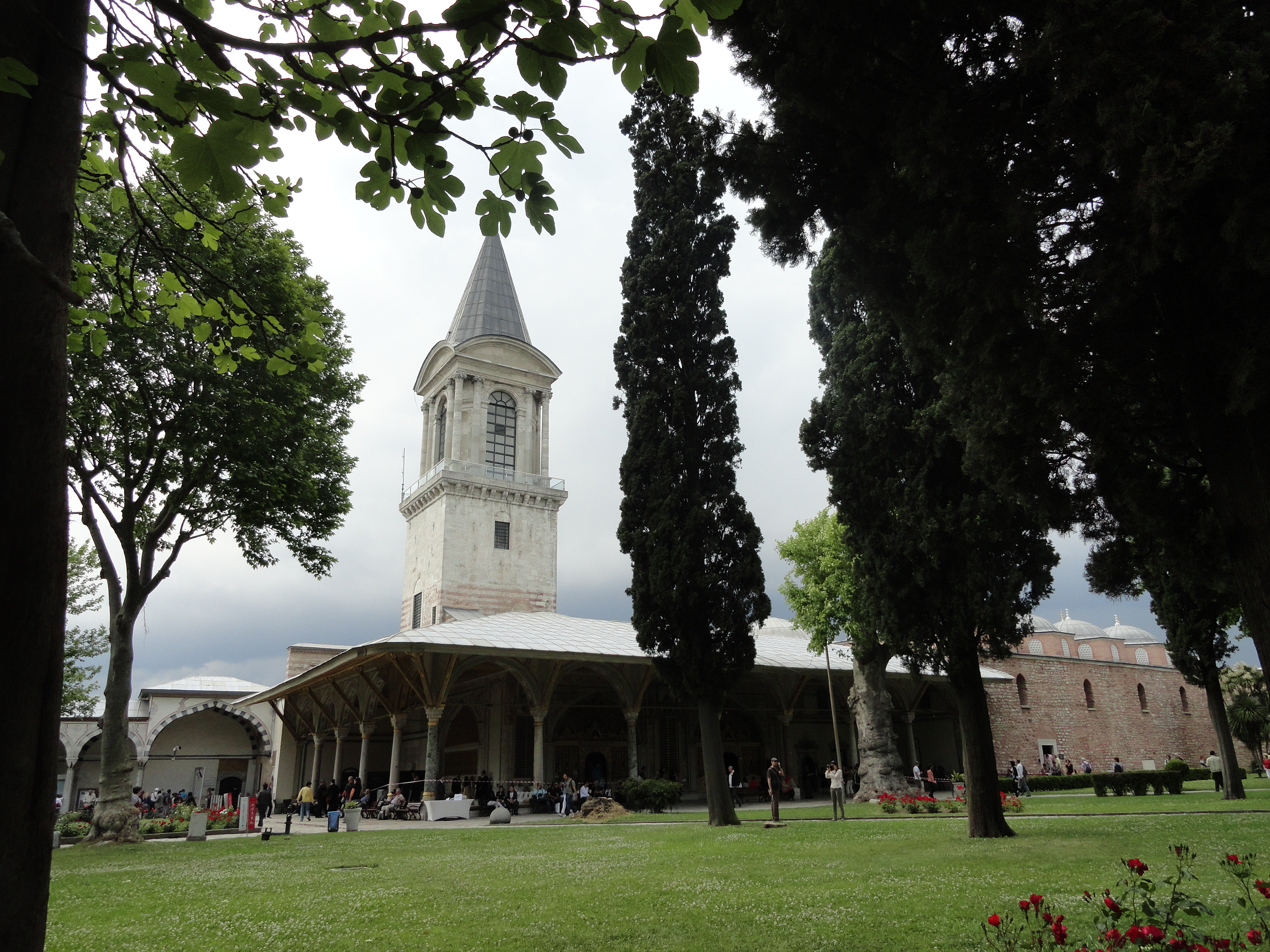
The Tower of Justice in Topkapi Palace

The Ottoman Empire was governed by different sets of laws during its existence. The Qanun or Kanun, sultanic law, co-existed with religious law (mainly the Hanafi school of Islamic jurisprudence). Legal administration in the Ottoman Empire was part of a larger scheme of balancing central and local authority (see Legal pluralism). Ottoman power revolved crucially around the administration of the rights to land, which gave a space for the local authority develop the needs of the local millet. The jurisdictional complexity of the Ottoman Empire was aimed to permit the integration of culturally and religiously different groups.

== Legal system ==
The Ottoman system had three court systems: one for Muslims, one for non-Muslims, involving appointed Jews and Christians ruling over their respective religious communities, and the "trade court". The codified administrative law was known as kanun and the ulema were permitted to invalidate secular provisions that contradicted the religious laws. In practice, however, the ulema rarely contradicted the kanuns of the Sultan.

These court categories were not, however, wholly exclusive: for instance, the Islamic courts—which were the Empire's primary courts—could also be used to settle a trade conflict or disputes between litigants of differing religions, and Jews and Christians often went to them to obtain a more forceful ruling on an issue. The Ottoman state tended not to interfere with non-Muslim religious law systems, despite legally having a voice to do so through local governors.

The Ottoman Islamic legal system was set up differently from traditional European courts. Presiding over Islamic courts would be a Kadı, or judge. However, the Ottoman court system lacked an appellate structure, leading to jurisdictional case strategies where plaintiffs could take their disputes from one court system to another until they achieved a ruling that was in their favor.

Throughout the 19th century, the Ottoman Empire adhered to the use of three different codes of criminal law. The first was introduced in 1840, directly following the Edict of Gülhane, an event which started the period of the Tanzimat reforms. In 1851, a second code was introduced. In this one, the laws were nearly the same as the ones in the first code of laws, but included the rulings of the previous eleven years. In 1859, the Ottoman Empire promulgated a last code of law inspired by the 1810 Napoleonic criminal code. Each of these variations of code and legislations represented a new phase in Ottoman legal ideology.

The Ottoman judicial system institutionalized a number of biases against non-Muslims, such as barring non-Muslims from testifying as witnesses against Muslims. At the same time, non-Muslims "did relatively well in adjudicated interfaith disputes", because anticipation of judicial biases prompted them to settle most conflicts out of court.

Court	Jurisdiction	Field	Highest Authority
Islamic Courts	Muslims	Civil/trade/criminal	Şeyhülislâm
Confessional courts	Non-Muslims	Civil/trade/criminal	Highest religious official of each millet
Consular courts	Foreigners	Civil/trade/criminal	Embassies
Trade courts (1840)	Mixed	Trade	Ministry of Trade
Regular courts (1870)	Muslims	Trade/Criminal	Ministry of Justice

== Sultanic edicts ("kanuns”) ==
In the Ottoman Empire, the edicts established by the Sultan were called "kanuns”. The kanuns were implemented alongside the religious law and were meant to supplement them. Within the changing society of a vast and diverse empire, interpreting laws that were unspecified in the Sharia proved to be difficult. To achieve some consistency in governance, the Sultans would issue decrees based on pre-Islamic custom (“örf”). However, “theoretically, none of the decrees was supposed to contradict Islamic law; instead, they were supposed to preserve it.” These kanuns were primarily focused on laws pertaining to the public, such as ceremonial, fiscal, feudal, and criminal law.

While Sharia law includes some provisions related to the administration or internal structure of State, or public law, it is heavily focused on private law. Sharia law is derived from the four basic sources of the Quran, Sunnah (precepts of Mohammed), ijma (teachings of Muslim scholars), and qiyas (analogical reasoning). Sharia in the Ottoman Empire prevailed in the fields of Law of Persons, Real Rights, Family, Inheritance, Obligations and Commercial Law. The foundation of Sharia law in the Ottoman Empire was based on the Hanafi school of Islamic jurisprudence. Religious and legislative matters were under the authority of the Shaykh al-Islam, although he did not have judicial powers. Execution and legislation were carried out through fatwas (religious decrees). The judicial system was managed by Kazaskers (chief military judges) and Kadis (Islamic judges), who were responsible for judicial affairs. The Kazasker was responsible for appointing and promoting Kadis within the Ottoman judicial system. In provinces, districts, and subdistricts, courts were presided over by Kadis, who acted as judges. Ottoman Sultans never interfered with the judgements passed by the Kadis in the field of private law, unless these judgements were unjust. These laws applied only to Muslim citizens; Non-Muslim Ottoman citizens were subject to the rules of their own religion when it came to private law.

Considering the individualistic nature of Islamic Law, the Ottoman Sultans deemed it necessary to establish decrees in public law, particularly in ceremony and feudal law, which are absent in Sharia Law. Since these edicts were absent from the Sharia, and the kanuns were created in support of it, the Sultan had full legislative power as long as they did not contradict Islamic principles. The kanun is based on “örf” (traditional customs) and is also referred to as “Örfi Hukuk” (Customary/Common Law). The Sultan would issue kanuns via royal decrees known as “Ferman”. When a collection of kanuns large enough is compiled and published, it is called a kanun-name (literally: “book of law”). Individual kanun-names would be given to provinces following their conquest, preserving the local traditions and legal principles under the previous rule. In fact, the adaptation of public law of a conquest is typical in Islamic Empires; since the Sharia gives no guidance in political administration and governance, Islamic Empires have historically adapted local practices and laws since the Four Caliphates. Alas, the variance in public laws within the empire does not take away from the importance of the kanun-names in solidifying central authority in the Ottoman Empire.

The legitimacy of the laws issued by the sultans was justified based on the authority given to rulers by Islam, in the Quranic verse: "Obey those in authority among you" (Qur'an 4:59). However, this obedience was conditional and was not allowed to surpass obedience to Allah and Prophet Muhammad. This is why while drafting the kanuns, Ottoman Sultans collaborated with state administrators in the Imperial Council (Divan). Among these administrators, religious scholars (ulema) were always present. However, some scholars argue that these kanun-names conflicted with secular governance and were in conflict with Islamic jurisprudence (fiqh) and fatwas. One example of such a controversial edict is Mehmed II’s codification of fratricide. The kanun-name was first codified by Mehmed II, after the fall of Constantinople in 1453. With one of his kanuns, Mehmed sanctioned the enthroned prince’s execution of all his brothers. In the eyes of the ulemas, the prevention of civil war deemed the law sufficiently flexible to be in line with the sharia, even though it is murder. The kanun-name also replaced hadd (punishment) with ta’zir, which adjusted the punishment according to the degree of the crime and the economic status of the criminal. Various sultans issued kanuns outlining punishments for theft in which the specific crime did not exactly match the Islamic legal stipulations. As such, scholars have generally characterized kanuns prior to the 1530s as “secular” in relation to the Sharia, but allowable since it is allowed for rulers to keep public order and uphold justice.

In Turkish, Suleiman the Magnificent is known as "Kanuni", the "Lawgiver", for his contributions as a lawmaker. Suleiman compiled all of the kanun-names before him, filtered through and edited them, and issued a single sultanic code, which would last for more than three-hundred years. His reforms include laws in land tenure and taxation, trusts in mortmain, marriage, and crimes and torts. Sultan Suleiman’s Shaykh al-Islam, Ebussuud, is credited with aligning common law with Islamic law, by helping establish the title of Caliphate to the Ottoman sultan. Not only was Suleiman ruler of the Ottoman Empire and leader of all Sunni Muslims (ummah), but now he was also ‘the interpreter and executor of God’s law’. This in turn completely blurred the lines between a supposedly secular kanun and the Sharia Law. It also brought the Islamic legal offices of jurisconsult (mufti) and Kadi fully under the ideological and fiscal authority of the Sultan. This shift in legislative power would eventually pave the way for the radical reforms in Ottoman law down the line.

== Reform efforts ==
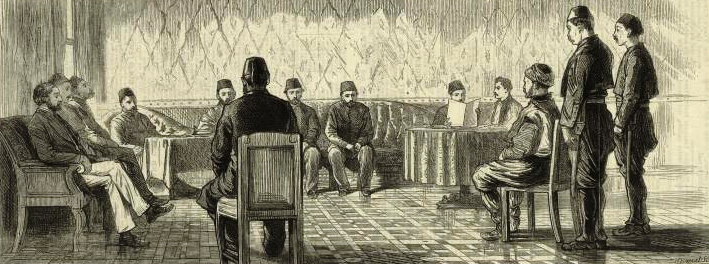
An Ottoman trial, 1877 (see image detail for explanation)

In the late 19th century, the Ottoman legal system saw substantial reform. This process of legal modernization began with the Edict of Gülhane of 1839. These series of law reforms began a new period of modernity in the Ottoman Empire that would pave the way for new Western ideas of politics and social ideology. These reforms included the "fair and public trial[s] of all accused regardless of religion", the creation of a system of "separate competences, religious and civil", and the validation of testimony of non-Muslims. Specific land codes (1858), civil codes (1869–1876), and a code of civil procedure also were enacted.

This reformation of the Ottoman legal system is attributed to the growing presence of Western ideology within Ottoman society. Critical areas of progressive law reform such as liberalism, constitutionality, and rule of law were all characteristics of the European system and began taking effect within the sectors of law that made up the Ottoman legal system. This ideology began to overtake Sharia law in fields such as commercial law, procedural law, and penal law and through these paths eventually into family law. Areas of life such as inheritance, marriage, divorce, and child custody were undergoing progressive transformation as European influence continued its growth. These reforms were also put in place at the insistence of the Great Powers of Europe as well as a response to them. The Europeans had begun to chip away at the edges of the Empire, and their power was growing in the region. After the Greek War of Independence, nationalism was on the rise in Europe, and Westerners thought they had a humanitarian duty to intervene on behalf of the Christians and Jews in the Ottoman Empire whom they saw as being unfairly treated. The British especially gained more power with the Treaty of Balta Liman in 1838, that required the Ottomans to abolish Ottoman monopolies and allow British merchants full access to Ottoman markets, as well as taxing them equally. Overall, the Ottoman Empire was feeling the threat of the Western powers' growing influence over the Empire in general, as well as the Jews and Christians living within the Empire. The Tanzimat reforms came about as a response to this as well as from an Ottoman desire to modernize to compete with the growing European powers.

Opposition to these legal changes can be found throughout historical accounts and historians believe that this reform was not due to popular demand of Ottoman citizens but rather to those who held power and influence within the empire.

These reforms also cultivated the version of Ottoman nationalism commonly referred to as Ottomanism. Influenced by European versions of a shared national identity, the Ottomans thought that creating an Ottoman Nationalism system where the state controlled all levels of government and social life, as opposed to the previous system where people were organized by individual community and reputation, that they could stave off the encroaching European influence over the Empire.

These reforms were based heavily on French models, as indicated by the adoption of a three-tiered court system. Referred to as the Nizamiye Courts (Regular Courts), this system was extended to the local magistrate level with the final promulgation of the Mecelle, a code of Islamic law covering all areas of civil law and procedure except family law. In an attempt to clarify the division of judicial competences, an administrative council laid down that religious matters were to be handled by religious courts, and statute matters were to be handled by the Nizamiye courts. Family law was codified in 1917, with the promulgation of the Ottoman Law of Family Rights.

== Copyright ==
As the Mecelle had no copyright codes, the empire's first code was the "Author's Rights Act of 1910" (Hakk-ı Telif Kanunu, 2 Düstor 273 (1910), 12 Jamad ul Awal 1328 or 22 May 1910), which only protected domestic works. The empire was not a part of the Bern Convention.

== See also ==
- Ministry of Justice (Ottoman Empire)
- Düstur
- Corps de droit ottoman
- Législation ottomane
- Yassa
- Roman law
- Sharia
