= Islamic court =

Islamic court or Islamic courts may refer to:

- Sharia court, a court that applies the Sharia
- Any court located in a Muslim-majority country, even if it follows secular law
- Islamic Revolutionary Court, a special system of courts in the Islamic Republic of Iran
- Islamic Courts Union, in Somalia
