= Konstantinos Photiadis =

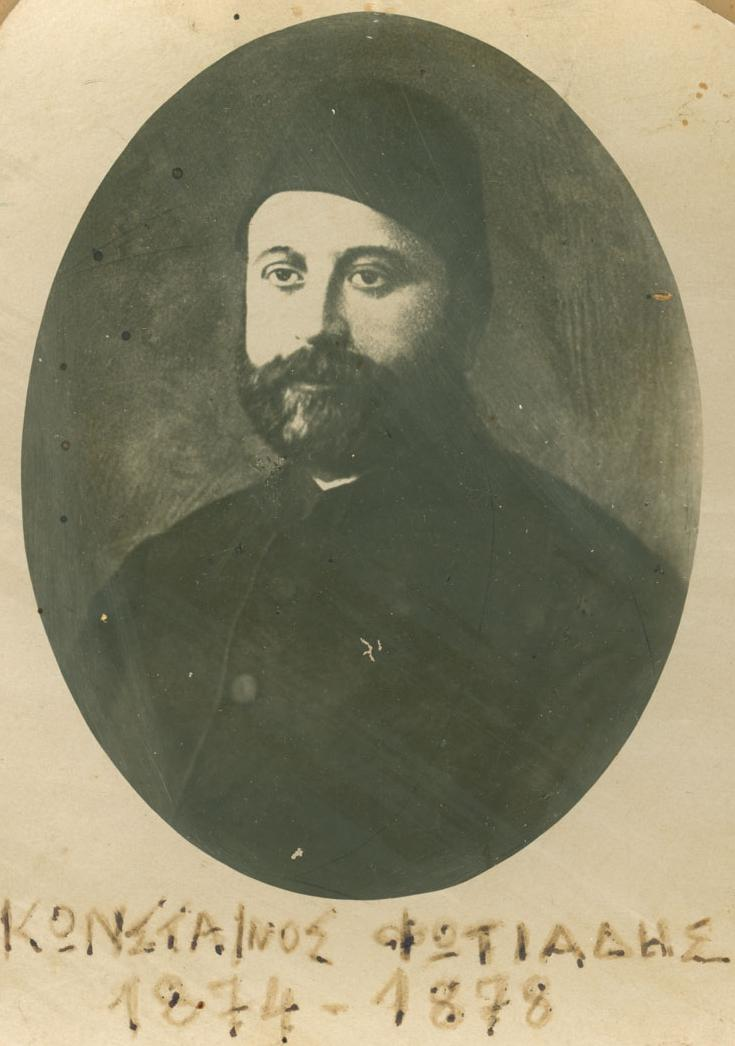

Prince of Samos
- In office 1874–1879
- Preceded by: Konstantinos Adosidis
- Succeeded by: Alexandros Karatheodoris

Personal details
- Born: 1830
- Died: 1897

The first volume of the Greek translation of the Mecelle, by Konstantinos Photiadis and Ioannis Vithynos

Konstantinos Photiadis (Greek: Κωνσταντίνος Φωτιάδης; died 1897) was the Ottoman-appointed Prince of Samos from 1874 to 1879.

Johann Strauss, author of "A Constitution for a Multilingual Empire: Translations of the Kanun-ı Esasi and Other Official Texts into Minority Languages," stated that he held the highest positions a Christian could in the empire and described him as one of several "Eminent figures of the Greek community", in which he participated. He held a teaching position at the "Great National School" (Megalē tou Genous scholē), with the literature in the Turkish language being his subject of instruction.

He served as a counsellor in the local council of the island of Crete, and from 29 May 1873 to 26 May 1874, the Principal of Galatasaray High School, prior to being appointed Prince of Samos. He also constructed the Princely Palace and the harbour in Vathi. He started the construction of Karlovasi harbour and he completed the saltpit there. He also founded Samos hospital, the Seminary in Malagari and boarding schools in Vathi and Karlovasi. He also was the primary editor of the Greek language newspaper Anatolikos Astēr ("Eastern Star").

He knew Turkish well, and he co-wrote a Greek-Turkish dictionary that was released in 1860, the first of its kind in the Ottoman Empire. He also was one of two translators of the Mecelle to its Greek version, Nomikoi kanones ētoi Astykos Kōdēx (Νομικοί κανόνες ήτοι Αστυκός Κώδηξ), the other being Ioannis Vithynos.

He also cofounded the Greek Literary Society (Syllogos).
