= Pavlos Mousouros =

Prince of Samos

Prince of Samos
- In office 1866–1873
- Preceded by: Miltiadis Aristarchis
- Succeeded by: Georgios Georgiadis (acting)

Personal details
- Born: 1810 Constantinople
- Died: 1876 (aged 65–66)

Pavlos Mousouros was the Ottoman-appointed Prince of Samos from 1866 to 1873.

He was the brother of Konstantinos Mousouros and like him became a diplomat, serving as ambassador of the Ottoman Empire to the Austrian Empire. He was recalled in 1866 and appointed Prince of Samos. During his tenure there, he constructed the road connecting Vathy with Mytilinioi and some bridges.

Disregarding the established rights and privileges of the Principality of Samos, he proposed the construction of a permanent camp for the Ottoman soldiers resident in the Principality. However the proposition was turned down by the Samian Parliament. He was generally viewed by the Samian population as an unjust ruler.
