= Konstantinos Karatheodoris =

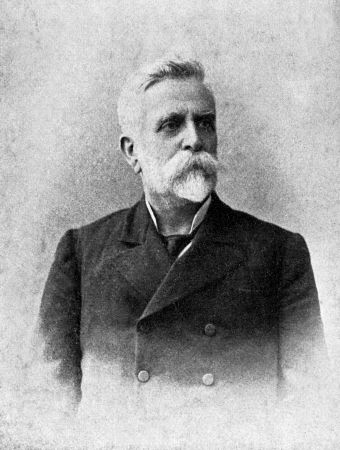
- 1905

Prince of Samos
- In office 1906–1907
- Preceded by: Ioannis Vithynos
- Succeeded by: Georgios Georgiadis

Personal details
- Born: c. 1841; Constantinople, Ottoman Empire
- Died: 1922; Athens, Greece

Konstantinos Karatheodoris (1841–1922) was an Ottoman Greek statesman, who was a member of the distinguished Phanariote Karatheodori family. He served as the Ottoman-appointed Prince of Samos from 1906 to 1907. He was the younger brother of the diplomat and statesman Alexander Karatheodori Pasha, who also served as Prince of Samos from 1885 to 1895.

== Biography ==
Karatheodoris was the son of Stephanos Karatheodoris.

In his youth, he studied Engineering in Europe. He became manager of the Ottoman railways, and then a member of the Supreme Council of the Ottoman Empire. He had also worked in Samos on the construction of the road connecting Vathy, Karlovasi, Marathokampos, Platanos, Pirgos and the capital, under Prince Miltiadis Aristarchis.

When he became Prince of Samos, he tried to reconcile the parties and bring peace to the island. He did not succeed. He made the same mistakes as everyone else before him, in that he championed the winning political party.

The Government under Themistoklis Sophoulis signed a contract with the Bank of Athens for the establishment of a Samian Bank. The opposite party did not want that and protested to the Ottoman government with the excuse that the establishment of a Samian bank was not a wise thing to do. The Sultan, annoyed by this, agreed to veto the decision. He illegally ordered the Principal to not validate the contract. Karatheodoris signed it against his wishes however. As a result, he was dismissed.
