= Konstantinos Adosidis =

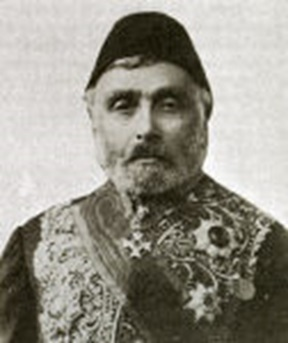

Prince of Samos
- In office 1873–1874
- Preceded by: Georgios Georgiadis
- Succeeded by: Konstantinos Photiadis
- In office 4 March 1879 – 1885
- Preceded by: Konstantinos Photiadis
- Succeeded by: Alexander Karatheodori Pasha

Ottoman Governor of Crete
- In office 1877–1878
- Preceded by: Hasan Sami
- Succeeded by: Ahmed Muhtar Pasha

Personal details
- Born: 1818 Kayseri
- Died: 1895 (aged 76–77) Büyükada

Konstantinos Adosidis (Κωνσταντίνος Αδοσίδης) (1818–1895) was the Ottoman-appointed Prince of Samos from 1873 to 1874, and again from 1879 to 1885.

A native of Constantinople, upon being appointed Prince of Samos he organized all the civil services of the Principality of Samos and he abolished the taxation system based on the tithe, earning him much popularity on the island After ruling for five months he was summoned back by the Ottoman Sultan in order to work elsewhere in administration of the Ottoman Empire, the Samian parliament begged the Sultan to reconsider. But he did not, disregarding the privileges and rights of the Principality of Samos, which stated that the Prince was appointed according to the will of the Samian people. He left Manolis Pyrgios as his representative to govern the island.

Appointed again as Prince of Samos in March 1879, he was welcomed back by the Samians as they remembered his fair ruling. He used to be strict and there were as a result few crimes. No trials took place during this second reign. He fought smuggling and tax favouritism. He settled the economy of the island.

However, his second reign was viewed by the Samians as unfair and too strict. He had a lot of administrative skills but he lacked in patience and calmness. He ended up becoming abrupt and arrogant. Thus he lost all of the people's and the parliament's support. He made more and more enemies every day. He ignored the privileges and rights of the Principality of Samos twice. The first time he dismissed the legally elected Parliament and the second he asked the Ottoman government to send 200 soldiers in order to reinforce the two armies that already remained illegally on the island.

But he also did some good during his second reign. He constructed the road between Mytilinii and Tigani, the aqueduct of Vathi, a lot of schools, prisons, the Court House in Marathokampos, and more.

But the Samians never forgave him for ignoring their rights and privileges. Although the first time the Samian Parliament fought his dismissal, the second time they asked for and obtained it.
