= Ioannis Vithynos =

Ottoman Greek statesman

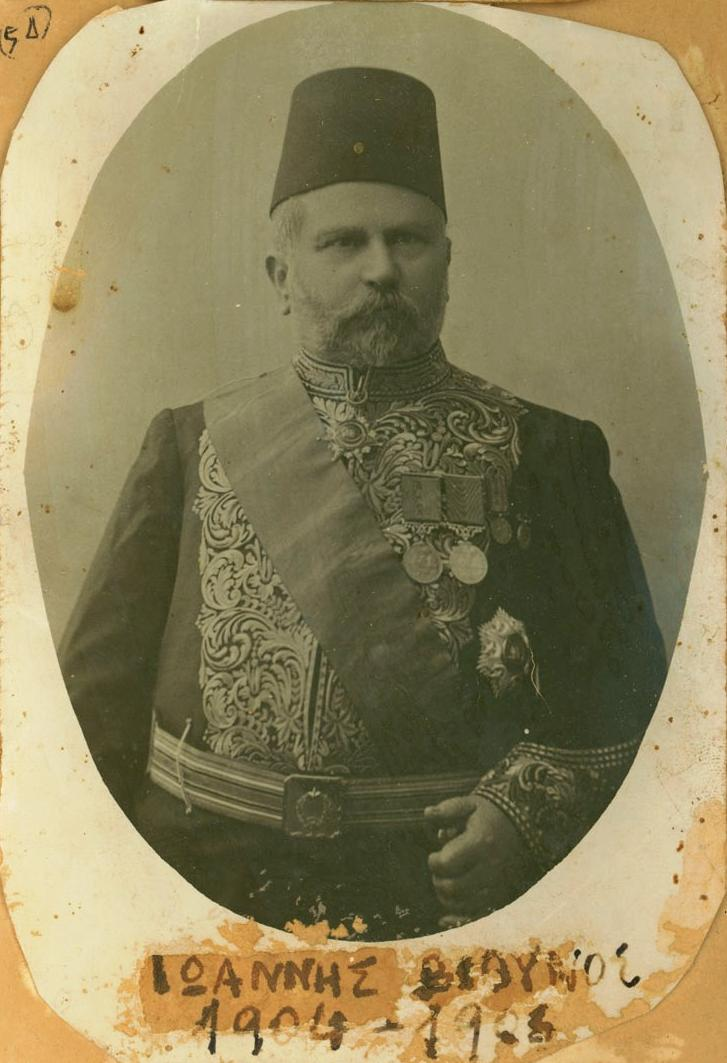

Prince of Samos
- In office 1904–1906
- Preceded by: Alexandros Mavrogenis
- Succeeded by: Konstantinos Karatheodoris

Personal details
- Born: 1847
- Died: 1912

The first volume of the Greek translation of the Mecelle, by Konstantinos Photiadis and Ioannis Vithynos

Yanko (Ioannis) Vithynos was an Ottoman Greek statesman, who was the Ottoman-appointed Prince of Samos from 1904 to 1906.

He wrote articles in Turkish for Ottoman Turkish publications, as he knew that language well. and completed his education at the Great National School (Megalē tou Genous scholē). He, with Konstantinos Photiades, co-translated the Mecelle into Greek, and he also wrote his commentary on the Ottoman Commercial Code (Ticaret Kanunnamesi).

== Career ==
He was Governor of Crete from 1868-1875, before the Darülfünun made him an honorary professor. From 1882 to 1904 he also taught at the Mekteb-i Hukuk, an Ottoman law school. In 1901 he became a member of the Ottoman elections assembly.

In addition he served in the Ottoman Ministry of Justice and the Constantinople tribunal de première instance, as the director of criminal investigations and as a judge, respectively.

He served as Prince of Samos from 1904 to 1906. The political situation when his reign began was agitated. He made it even worse by repeating the same mistake as his predecessors: he supported only one political party. Embezzlements, thefts, murders, revenge and political factionalism were common during his reign. The parties accused each other through the press. In order to make things a little better, he imposed censorship on the press.

Then elections came and the two parties competed with each other in violence, mischief and illegal agitation. The newly elected Parliament blamed Vithynos for the politicians' mistakes and overthrew him.
