= Sharia court =

Judicial institution in Islam

A Sharia court (Note: Also referred to as Shari'a court, Shar'iyya court, Shar court, Shar'i court or Shariatic court in English.) (Arabic: محكمة شرعية, romanized: maḥkama šarʿiyya) is a court which applies and interprets the Sharia. Sharia courts exist in several countries, and may operate alongside secular courts.

== History ==
Sharia courts have their origins in early Islamic history, where judges known as qadis administered justice based on the Quran, the Hadiths and fiqh. Historically, these courts handled a broad range of matters in Muslim-majority countries.

Sharia courts in the Ottoman Empire were for a long time the primary institutions for applying both Islamic law and imperial laws. During the mid-19th century Tanzimat, specialized commercial courts and later the Nizamiye Courts were established, reducing the jurisdiction of Sharia courts.

== Modern-day Sharia courts by country ==
=== Ethiopia ===
Quoting Susanne Epple and Getachew Assefa, in Ethiopia

The Sharia courts are composed of a three-tiered structure at both federal and regional levels, and administer Islamic law on matters falling within their jurisdiction. They function separately and independently of Ethiopia's ordinary courts, but function as 'state' courts in that they are subject to statutory law, accountable to the state judiciary and subject to review by the Supreme courts at both federal and state levels.

Ethiopian Sharia courts conduct their proceedings in Amharic rather than Arabic.

=== Israel ===
In Israel, Sharia courts have jurisdiction over family matters for Muslims.

=== Malaysia ===
Sharia courts are one of the two separate court systems which exist in the general Malaysian legal system.

=== Pakistan ===
In Pakistan, the Federal Shariat Court examines if the country's laws comply with the sharia.

=== Saudi Arabia ===
In Saudi Arabia, Sharia courts apply Islamic law according to the Hanbali school of Sunnism, exercising their jurisdiction over both general and residual matters.

=== Singapore ===
The Syariah Court of Singapore was constituted in 1958.

== Sources ==
- Abiad, Nisrine (2008). Sharia, Muslim States and International Human Rights Treaty Obligations: A Comparative Study.
- Carmichael, Tim (2001). Aproaching Ethiopian History.
- Epple, Susanne; Assefa, Getachew (2020). Legal Pluralism in Ethiopia: Actos, Challenges and Solutions.
