= Grigorios Vegleris =

Prince of Samos in 1912

Prince of Samos
- In office 1912–1912
- Preceded by: Andreas Kopasis
- Succeeded by: Annexation of Samos by Greece

Personal details
- Born: 1862
- Died: 1948 (aged 85–86)

Grigorios Vegleris was Prince of Samos briefly in 1912, succeeding the assassinated Andreas Kopasis. With the outbreak of the First Balkan War in October 1912, the exiled Samian political leader Themistoklis Sophoulis returned to the island and assumed control, declaring its union with the Kingdom of Greece.
