= Ahmed Muhtar Pasha =

Grand Vizier of the Ottoman Empire (1839-1919)

Gazi Ahmed Muhtar Pasha
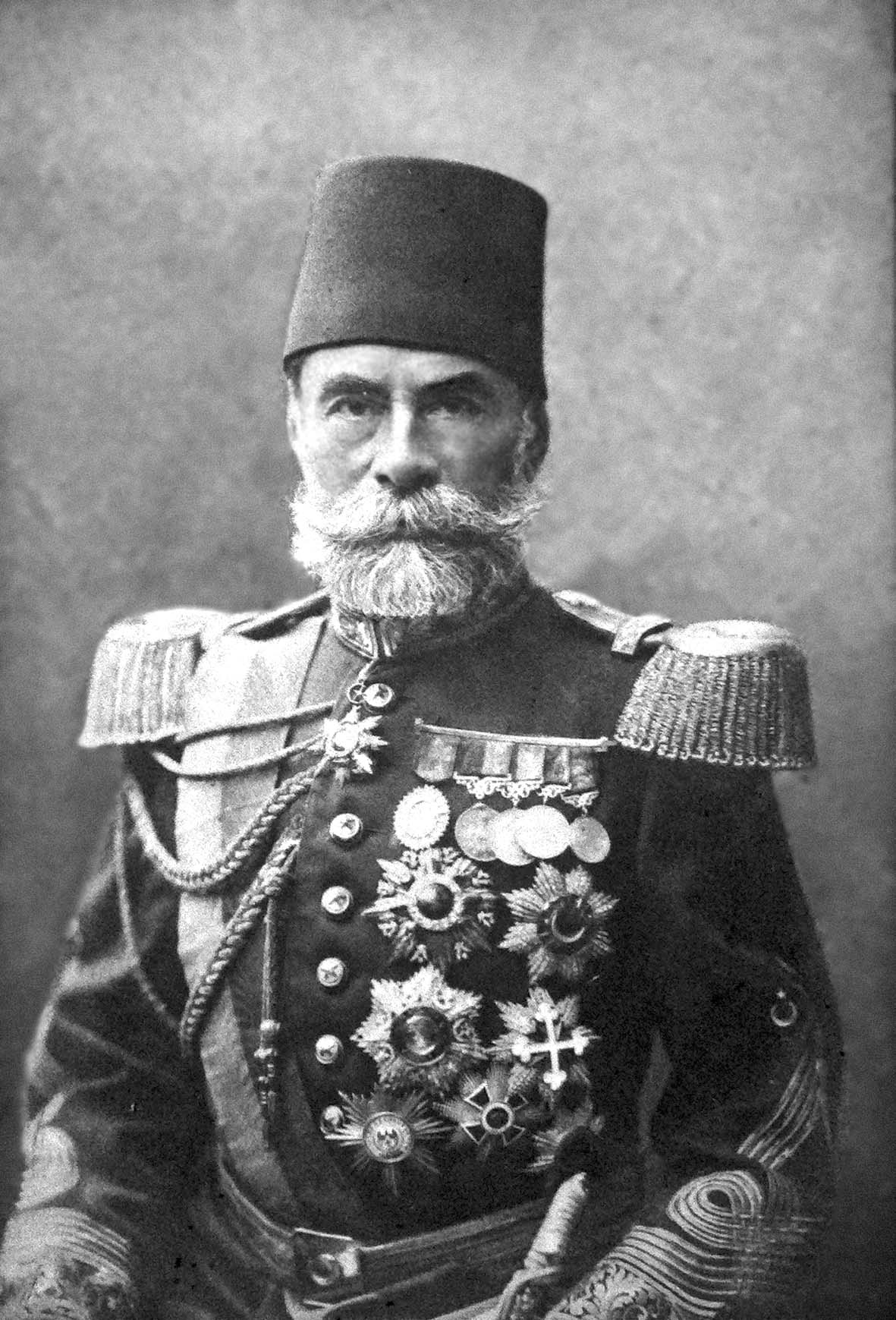

Grand Vizier of the Ottoman Empire
- In office 22 July 1912 – 29 October 1912
- Monarch: Mehmed V
- Preceded by: Mehmed Said Pasha
- Succeeded by: Kâmil Pasha

Ottoman Governor of Crete
- In office 1878–1878
- Preceded by: Konstantinos Adosidis
- Succeeded by: Alexander Karatheodori Pasha
- In office 1875–1876
- Preceded by: Redif Pasha
- Succeeded by: Hasan Sami

Personal details
- Born: 1 November 1839 Bursa, Hüdavendigâr Eyalet, Ottoman Empire
- Died: 21 January 1919 (aged 79) Istanbul, Ottoman Empire
- Children: Mahmud Muhtar Pasha
- Education: Ottoman Military College
- Nickname: The Victorious

Military service
- Allegiance: Ottoman Empire
- Branch/service: Ottoman Army
- Years of service: 1856–1885
- Rank: Field marshal
- Commands: Second Army Corps
- Battles/wars: Crimean War; Battle of Cetate; Herzegovina Uprising; Russo-Turkish War (1877–78); Battle of Kızıl Tepe; Battle of Erzurum (1877)

Ahmed Muhtar Pasha (Ottoman Turkish: احمد مختار پاشا; 1 November 1839 – 21 January 1919) was a prominent Ottoman field marshal and Grand Vizier, who served in the Crimean and Russo-Turkish wars. Ahmed Muhtar Pasha was appointed as Grand Vizier in July 1912 at age 72, largely due to his prestige as an old military hero.

== Biography ==
=== Early life and military career ===
Ahmed Muhtar was born on 1 November 1839 to a Turkish family in Bursa in the Ottoman Empire and was educated in the Ottoman Military College in Istanbul. His father was merchant Halil Efendi. He eventually became professor and then governor of the school.

Oriental Army of the Crimean campaign by Gustav Bartsch. From left to right: Admiral Ferdinand-Alphonse Hamelin, Lord Lucan, Lord Raglan, Admiral Dundas, Sir John Campbell, Duke of Cambridge, Lord Cardigan, Ismail Pasha, Omer Pasha, Muhlis Pasha (Grigore Sturdza), Sultan Abdülmecid I, Said-Bey (Vasile Obedeanu), Ahmed Pasha, col. Desmaret, Marshal Baraguey d'Hilliers, Prince Napoleon, col. Trochu, Marshal de Saint-Arnaud, general Bosquet, general de Canrobert

In 1856, he served as an adjutant during the Crimean War. In 1862, he was a staff officer in the disastrous Montenegrin campaign. Between 1870 and 1871, he quelled rebellions in Yemen. He gained the titles of Pasha and müşir (field marshal), and in 1873, was made commander of the Second Army Corps, holding the position until 1876. During the 1875 uprisings in Bosnia and Herzegovina, he assumed control of the Ottoman forces there. On the outbreak of the Russo-Turkish War, 1877-1878, he was sent to take charge of operations in Erzurum. Although the Russians ultimately defeated the Ottomans in the war, Muhtar's earlier victories against them on the eastern front won him the title Gazi ("The Victorious"). His forces were eventually overwhelmed by Russian numerical superiority.

In 1879, Ahmed Muhtar Pasha was appointed the commander of the Ottoman Empire's frontier with Greece, before being sent in 1885 to serve as the Ottoman High Commissioner in Egypt.

=== Later life and premiership ("Great Cabinet") ===
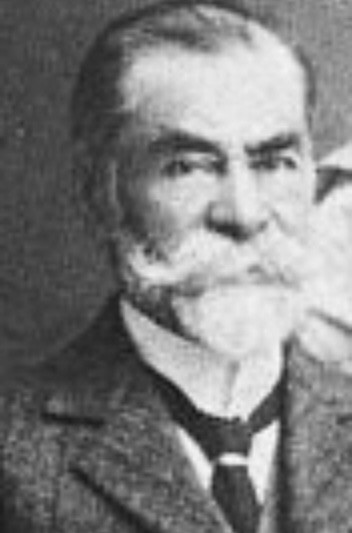
Ahmed Muhtar Pasha, 1910s

Ahmed Muhtar Pasha was appointed as Grand Vizier in July 1912 at age 72, largely due to his prestige as an old military hero. His premiership was a result of the Savior Officers (Turkish: Halâskâr Zâbitân) forcing the dissolution of the previous Committee of Union and Progress (CUP) government under Grand Vizier Mehmed Said Pasha. The Savior Officers were partisans of the opposition Freedom and Accord Party (also known as the Liberal Union or Entente) who felt cheated after the infamous 1912 elections, known as the "Election of Clubs" (Turkish: Sopalı Seçimler), in which the CUP had employed electoral fraud and violence to gain 269 of the 275 seats in the Chamber of Deputies (Turkish: Meclis-i Mebusan, the popularly elected lower house of the national General Assembly) while leaving only 6 to the opposition.

The non-party, independent cabinet formed by Ahmed Muhtar Pasha was known as the "Great Cabinet" (Turkish: Büyuk Kabine) because it included three former Grand Viziers as ministers and sometimes as the "Father-Son Cabinet" (Turkish: Baba-Oğul Kabinesi) because it included Ahmed Muhtar Pasha's son, Mahmud Muhtar Pasha, as Minister of the Navy. Because the Great Cabinet did not include any members of the CUP, rumors began to spread that the government would dissolve the Chamber of Deputies, which was dominated by CUP after the fraudulent 1912 elections. A few days after Ahmed Muhtar Pasha took office, the Savior Officers sent a letter of threat to the President of the Chamber of Deputies (and CUP member), Halil Bey, demanding that the Chamber be dissolved for new elections within 48 hours. The CUP members in the Chamber condemned and censured this threat. However, thanks to a law he had passed through the Senate, Ahmed Muhtar Pasha was able, with the sultan's support, to dissolve the Chamber with ease on 5 August.

After the dissolution of the Chamber, the First Balkan War erupted early in October 1912, catching Ahmed Muhtar Pasha's administration off-guard. Martial law was declared, and Ahmed Muhtar Pasha resigned as Grand Vizier on 29 October after just four months in the premier's office.

=== Death ===
Ahmed Muhtar Pasha died in Istanbul on 21 January 1919 at the age of 79. His son Mahmud Muhtar Pasha was also a high-ranking commander in the Ottoman Army and the Minister of the Navy in Ahmed Muhtar Pasha's own government. After the proclamation of the Turkish Republic, the Turkish government published a postage stamp with his image to honor his legacy.

== Gallery ==
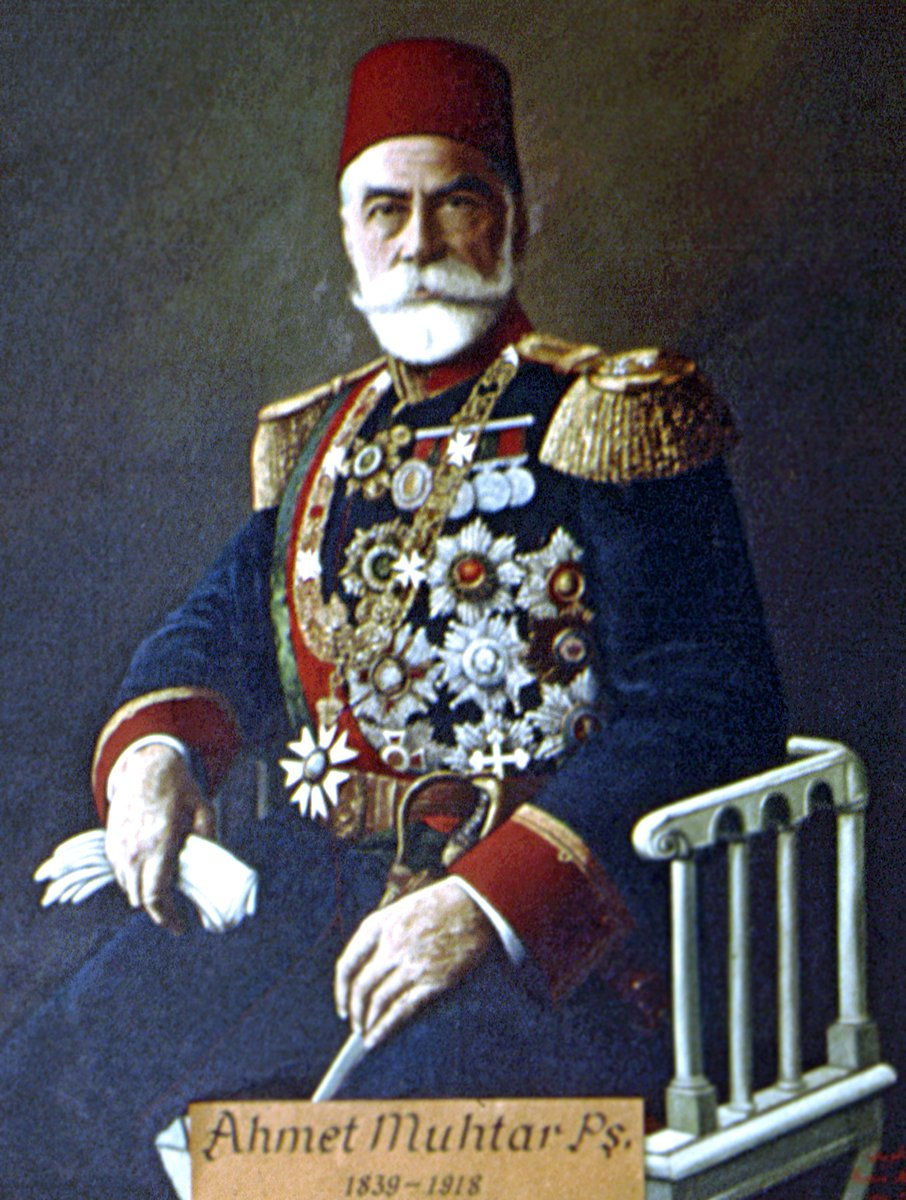

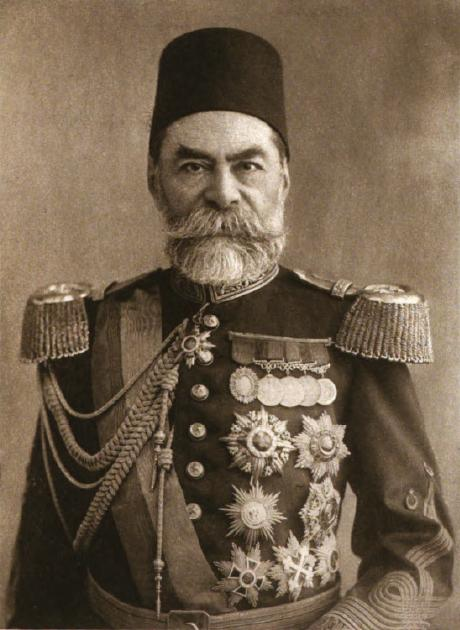

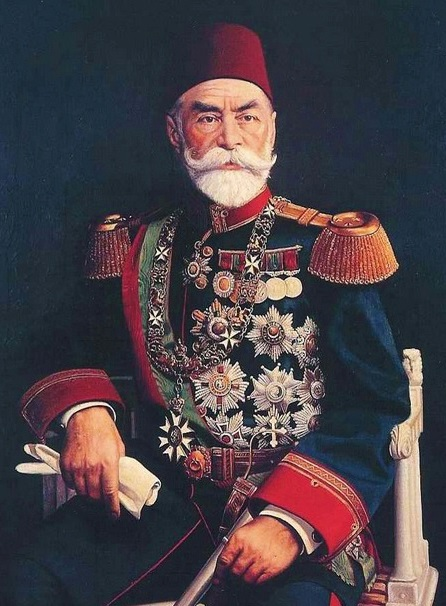

== See also ==
- 1912 Ottoman general election
- List of Ottoman grand viziers

Political offices
Preceded by Redif Pasha	Ottoman Governor of Crete; 1875–1876	Succeeded by Hasan Sami
Preceded by Konstantinos Adosidis	Ottoman Governor of Crete; 1878	Succeeded by Alexander Karatheodori
Preceded by Mehmed Said Pasha	Grand Vizier of the Ottoman Empire; 22 July 1912 – 29 October 1912	Succeeded by Kâmil Pasha
