= Andreas Kopasis =

Prince of Samos from 1908 to 1912

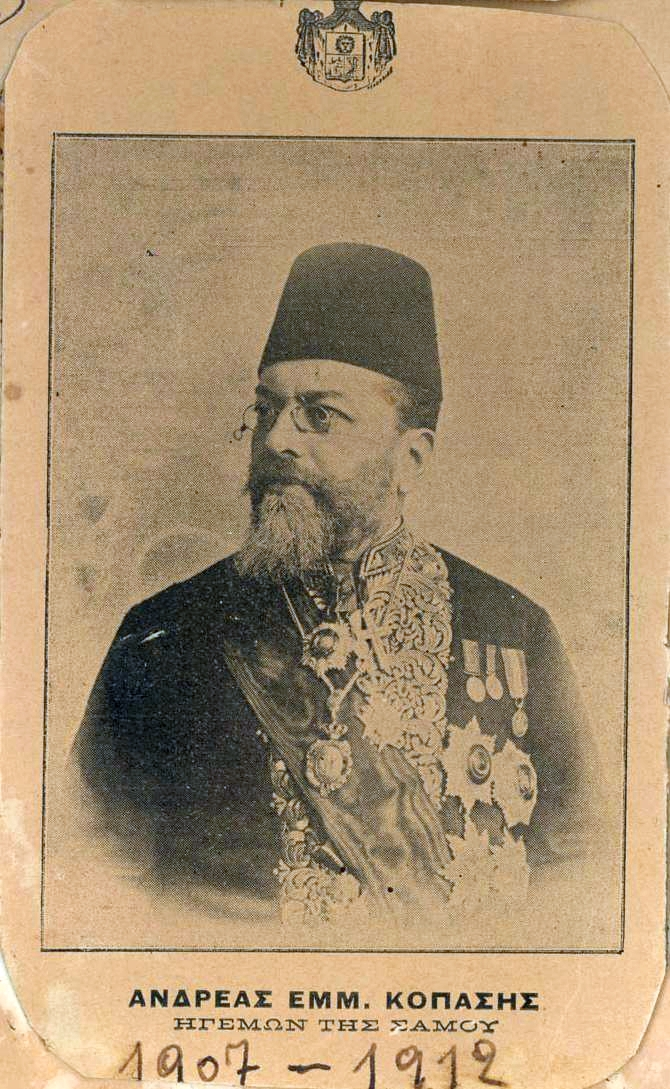

Prince of Samos
- In office January 1908 – 24 March 1912
- Preceded by: Georgios Georgiadis
- Succeeded by: Grigorios Vegleris

Personal details
- Born: 1856 Sfakia
- Died: 24 March 1912 (aged 55–56) Samos

Andreas Kopasis was the Ottoman-appointed Prince of Samos from 1908 to 1912. His tenure was widely regarded as pro-Turkish and tyrannical. His bringing in of additional Ottoman troops in 1908 caused a revolt to break out among the Samians, which was quelled brutally by further Ottoman reinforcements. The leaders of the pro-Greek opposition, including Themistoklis Sophoulis, fled the island for Greece.

Kopasis was assassinated by a pro-Sophoulis agent on 24 March 1912. He was assassinated following a plan prepared by the Macedonian fighters Stavros Kazantzis (Baretis) and Athanasios Stavroudis and the "Macedonian Committee of Athens", allied to Sofoulis, on 9/22 March 1912, with his entourage also killing Stavros Baretis.
