= Principality of Samos =

Autonomous tributary state of the Ottoman Empire from 1834 to 1912

Coordinates: 37.7333°N 26.9833°E

Principality of Samos Sisam İmâreti (Ottoman Turkish) Ηγεμονία της Σάμου (Greek)
- 1834–1912
- Flag Coat of arms

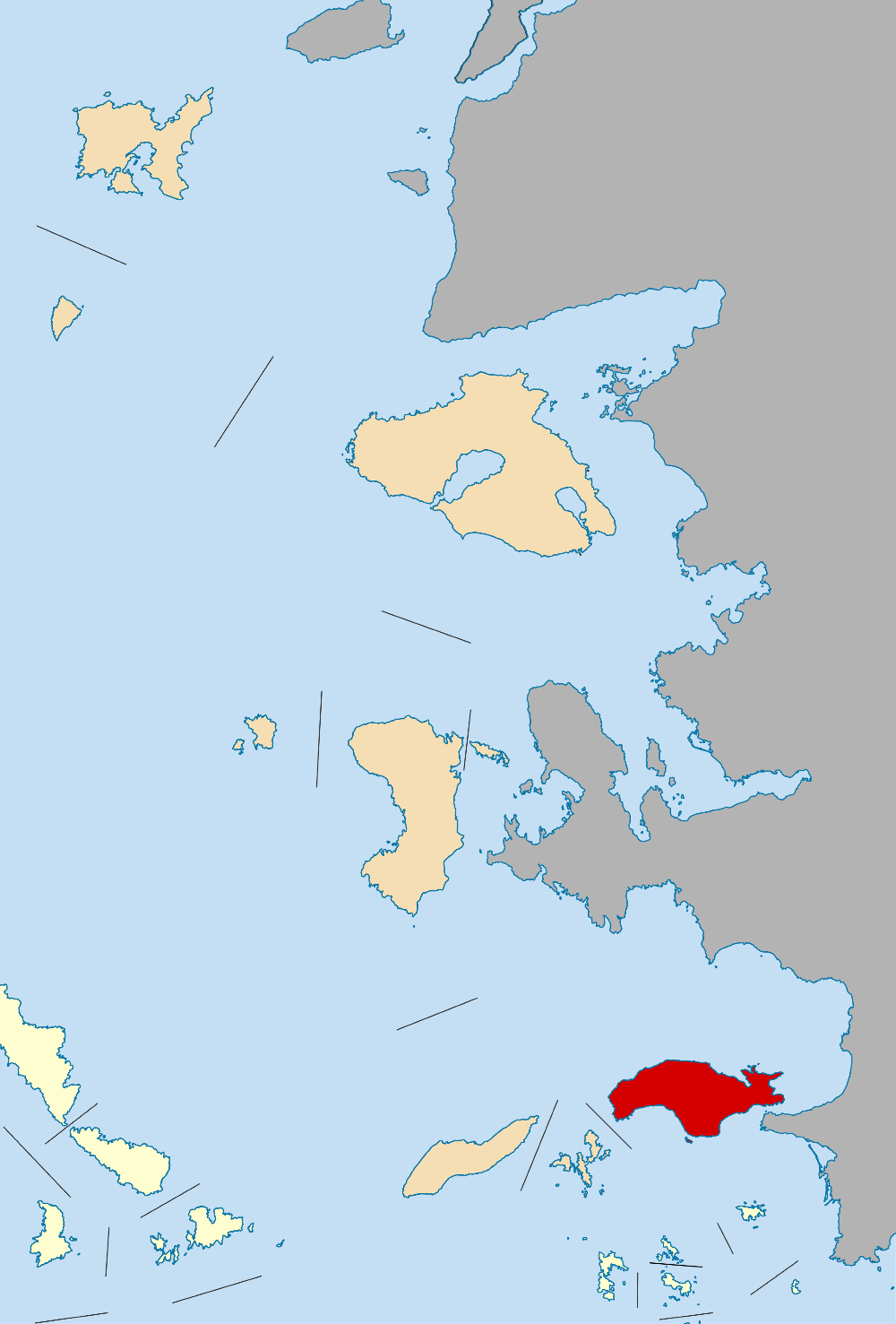
- Location of the Principality of Samos
- Status: Autonomous state under Ottoman suzerainty
- Capital: Chora, later Vathy
- Common languages: Greek
- Religion: Greek Orthodoxy; Sunni Islam
- Government: Principality
- Prince of Samos
  - 1834–1850 (first): Stefan Bogoridi
  - 1912 (last): Grigorios Vegleris
- Legislature: Assembly of Samos
  - Upper house: Senate
  - Lower house: Chamber of Deputies
- History
  - Established: 1834
  - Official act of Union with Greece: 1912
Preceded by	Succeeded by
Military-Political System of Samos	Kingdom of Greece
- Today part of: Greece

The Principality of Samos (Greek: Ηγεμονία της Σάμου, Igemonía tis Sámou; Ottoman Turkish: Sisam İmâreti; Turkish: Sisam Beyliği) was an autonomous tributary state of the Ottoman Empire from 1834 to 1912. The island of Samos had participated in the Greek War of Independence since 1821 and had successfully resisted several Ottoman and Egyptian attempts to occupy it, but it was not included within the boundaries of the newly independent Greek state. Instead in 1834 the island was granted self-governance as a semi-independent state.

Tributary to the Ottoman Empire, forced to pay annual sum of £2700, it was to be governed by a Prince of Christian Greek descent, but nominated by the Sublime Porte. The Prince was to be assisted in his function as chief executive by a Senate composed of 4 members. These members were chosen by the Prince out of eight candidates nominated by the four districts of the island: Vathy, Chora, Marathokampos, and Karlovasi. The actual legislative power belonged to a chamber of 36 deputies, presided over by the Greek-Orthodox Metropolitan. The seat of the government was the port city of Vathy.

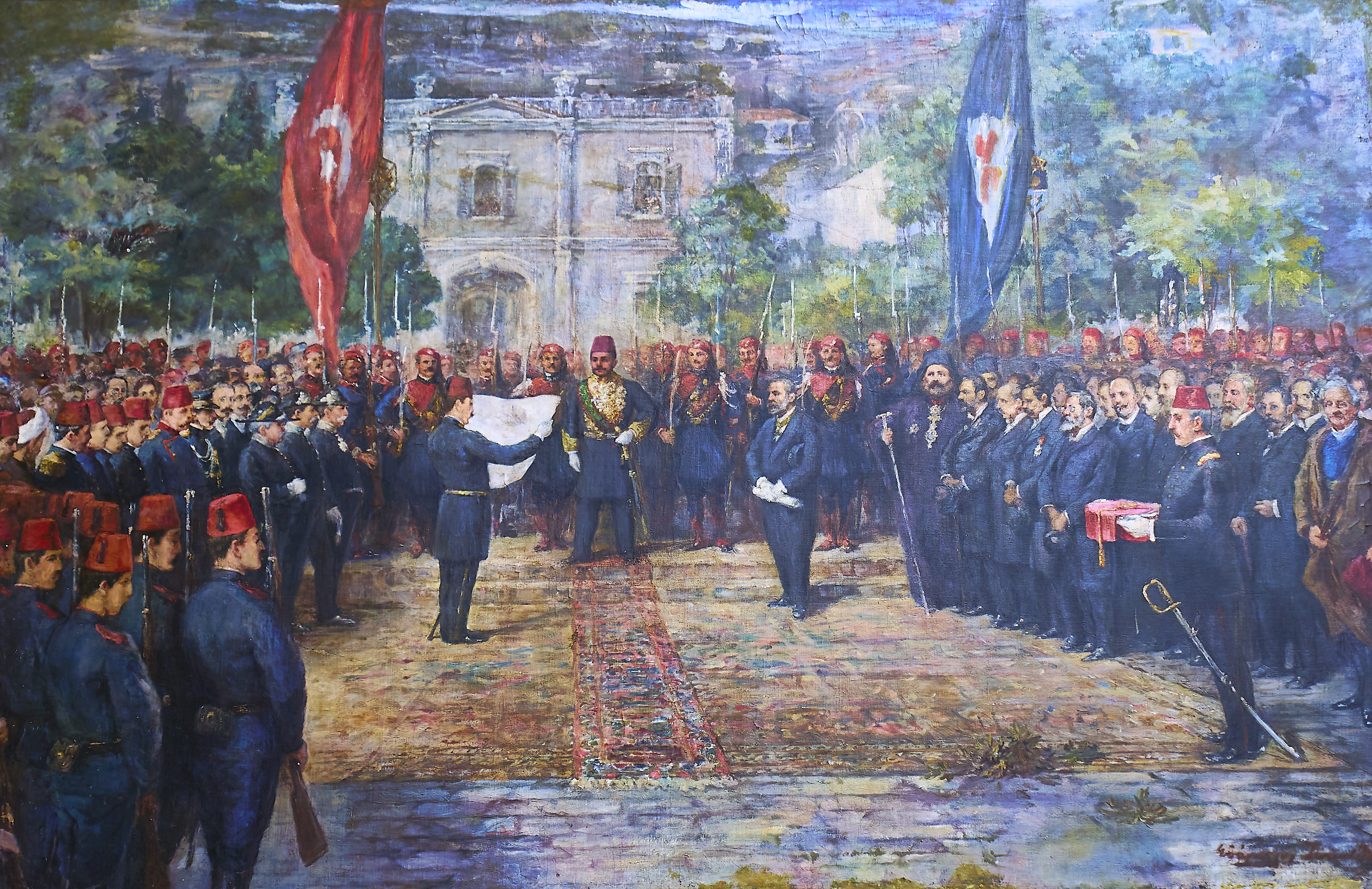
Portrait depicting the appointment of Ion Ghica as Prince of Samos

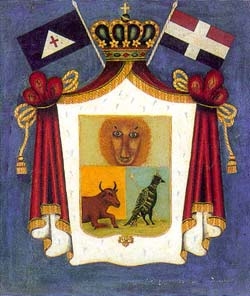
Variant of the Coat of Arms of Samos ca. 1860-1880

With the outbreak of the First Balkan War, Themistoklis Sofoulis landed on the island with a group of exiled Samians and swiftly took control: the Ottoman garrison withdrew to Anatolia, and on 24 November 1912, the island's parliament officially declared Enosis with Greece. The unification took place officially on 2 March 1913.

== History ==
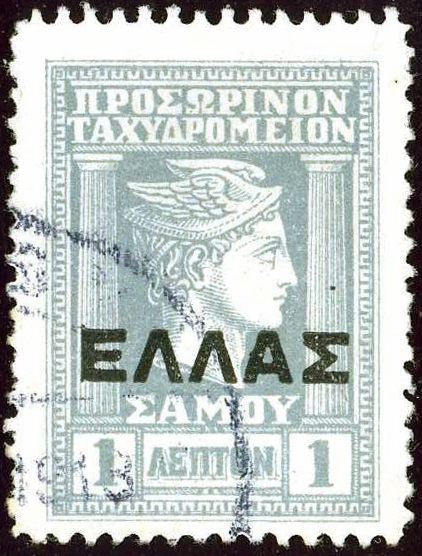
Stamp issued by the Government of Samos, overprinted ELLAS in December 1912

During the Greek War of Independence Samos formed its own autonomous administration under the leadership of Lykourgos Logothetis. Following the burning of the Ottoman flagship by Konstantinos Kanaris and the successes of the Hydriots in the naval theatre of the war, the plans for the invasion of the island were abandoned by the Ottomans, and Samos held out until the end of the war. Following the Treaty of Constantinople and the London Conference in 1832, the island was given to the Ottomans, but held an advantageous position as self-governed and ruled by a Greek governor nominated by the Sublime Porte, who bore the title of "Prince of Samos", but was supported by a Greek council and assembly.

The capital of the island was, until the early 20th century, a place called Chora, about 2 miles (3.2 km) away from the shore, but after the changes in Samos' political condition, the capital was transferred to Vathy, situated at the head of a deep bay on the north coast of the island, which became the residence of the Prince and the seat of the government.

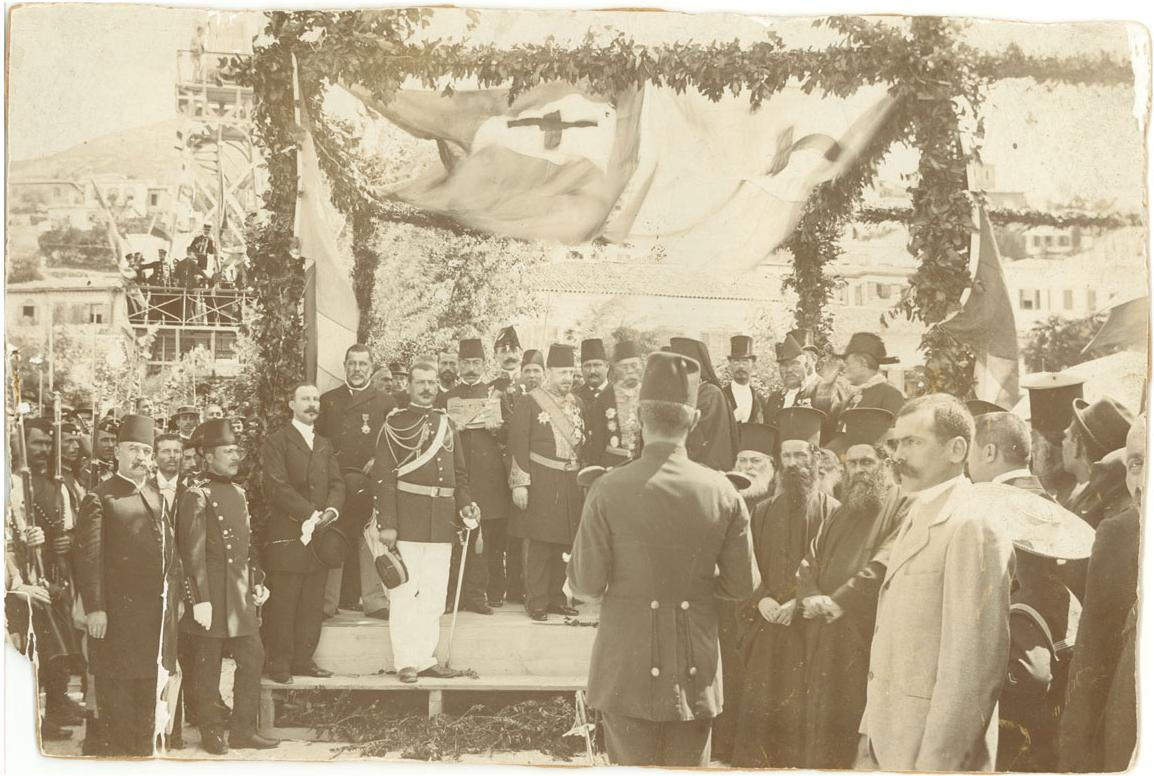
Image of Stephanos Mousouros taking the oath of office as Prince of Samos

The authors of the "Samos" article in the Encyclopædia Britannica Eleventh Edition thought the prosperity of the island in 1911 bore witness to the wisdom of the semi-independent arrangement. Its principal export was its wine, which was celebrated in ancient times and still enjoyed a high reputation in the Levant. Its exports also consisted of silk, oil, raisins and other dried fruits. The population in 1900 was about 54,830 people, not including the 15,000 Samians living on the Greek mainland. The predominant religion was Greek Orthodoxy. The metropolitan district included Samos and Ikaria. In 1900 there were 634 foreigners on the island (523 Greek citizens, 13 Germans, 29 French, 28 Austrians and 24 of other nationalities).

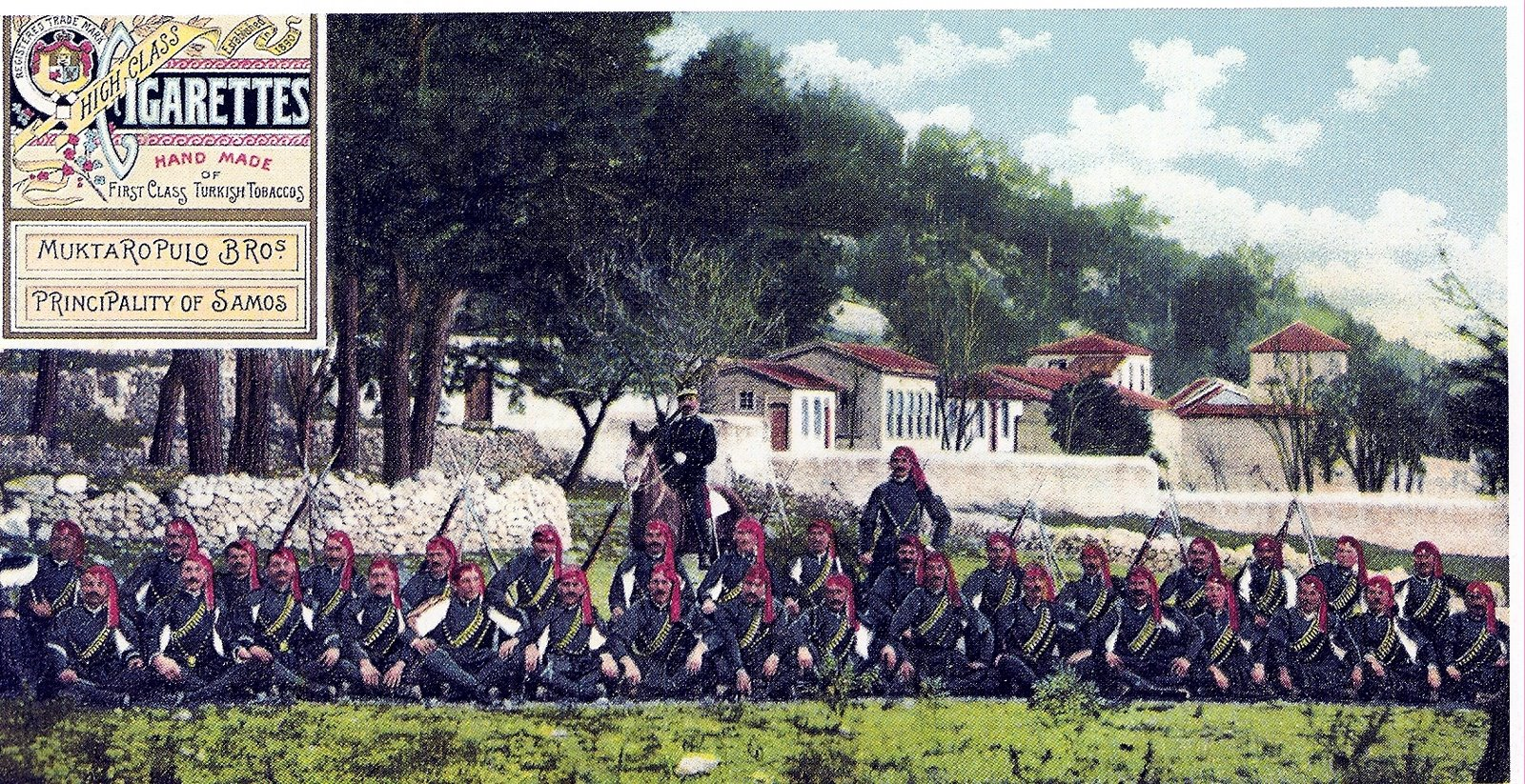
Men of the Princely Gendarmerie of Samos in 1899

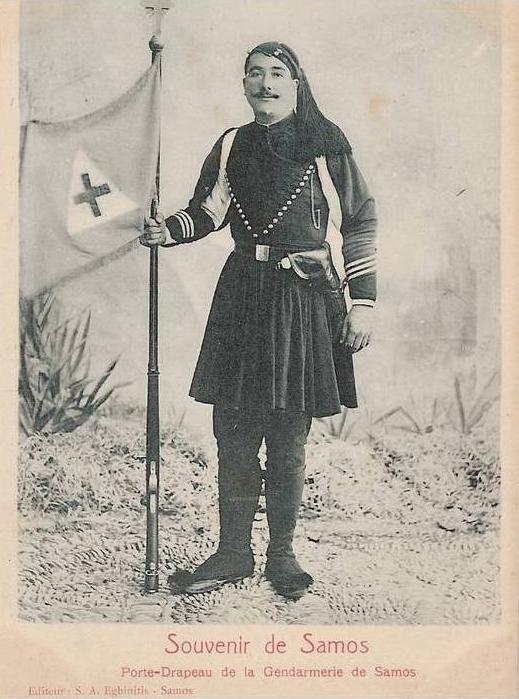
Flag bearer of the Samian Gendarmerie

Pro-Greek agitators and the reaction of the pro-autonomy faction led to increased tensions, and in May 1908, the Prince Andreas Kopasis, asked for the intervention of the Ottoman military. The ensuing riots left several dead. With the outbreak of the First Balkan War, Themistoklis Sofoulis landed on the island with a group of exiled Samians and forced the Ottoman garrison to withdraw from the island. On 11/24 November 1912, the island's parliament officially declared enosis with Greece. The unification took place officially on 2 March 1913. Sofoulis remained for a while as the president of the interim government of Samos until April 1914, when he was appointed Governor of Macedonia.

== List of Princes of Samos ==
Portrait	Name	Birth	Death	From	Until	Notes
	Stephanos Vogoridis	1775	1859	January 1833	1850	
	Alexandros Kallimachis	1800	1876	1850	1854	
	Ion Ghica	1817	1897	April 1854	1859	
	Miltiadis Aristarchis	1809	1893	1859	1866	
	Pavlos Mousouros	1810	1876	1866	1873	
	Georgios Georgiadis (acting)	1866		1873	1873	
	Konstantinos Adosidis	1818	1895	1873	1874	
	Konstantinos Photiadis	1830	1897	1874	1879	
	Konstantinos Adosidis (again)	1818	1895	4 March 1879	1885	
	Alexandros Karatheodoris	1833	1906	1885	1895	
	Georgios Verovits	1845		1895	1896	
	Stephanos Mousouros	1841	1906	July 1896	1899	
	Konstantinos Vagianis	1846	1919	7 March 1899	1900	
	Michail Grigoriadis	1841		16 August 1900	1902	
	Alexandros Mavrogenis	1845	1929	12 March 1902	5 May 1904	
	Ioannis Vithynos	1847	1912	5 May 1904	1906	
	Konstantinos Karatheodoris	1841	1922	July 1906	September 1907	
	Georgios Georgiadis	1866		August 1907	January 1908	
	Andreas Kopasis	1856	1912	January 1908	22 March 1912	
	Grigorios Vegleris	1862	1948	April 1912	August 1912	

== Gallery ==
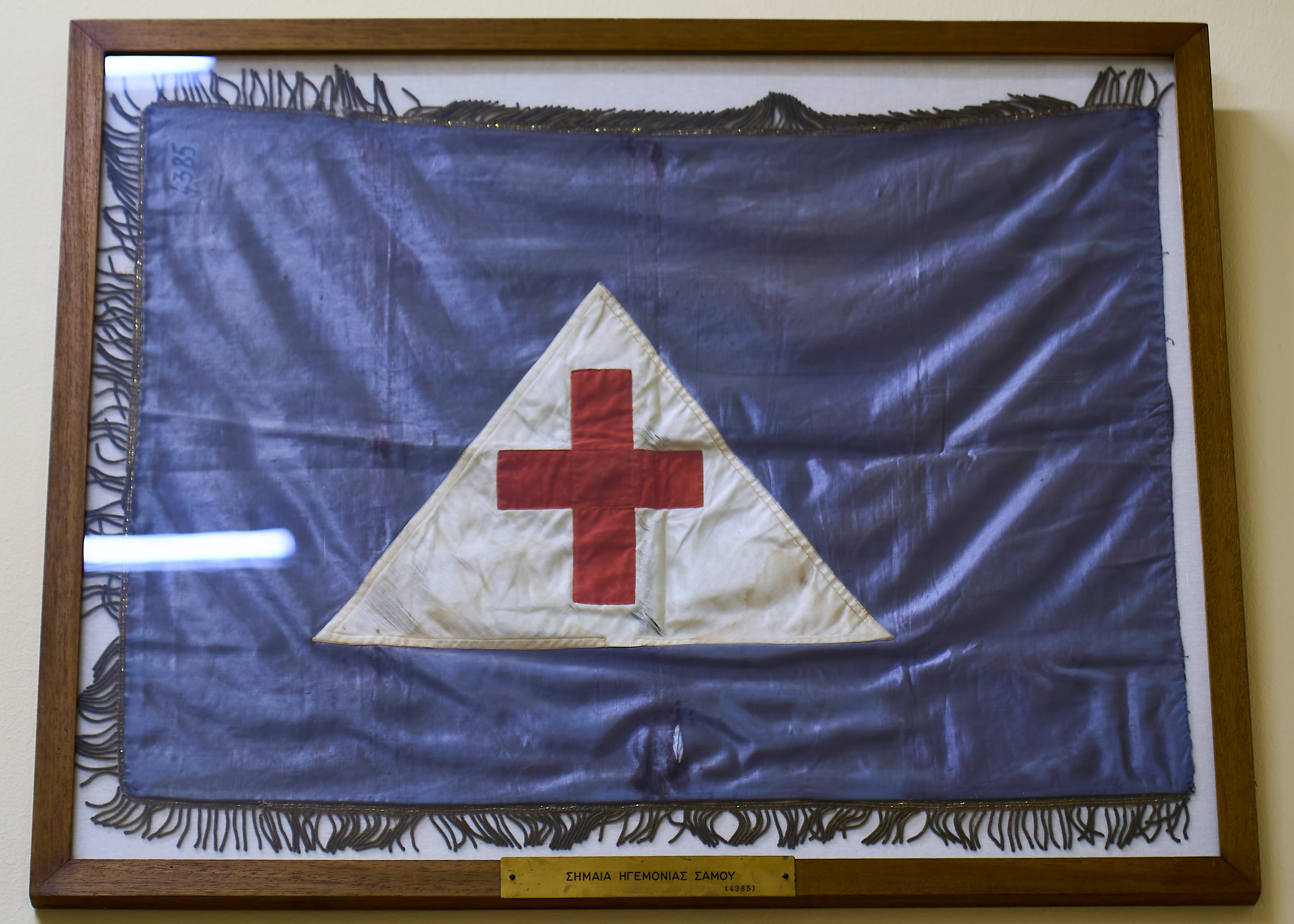
Flag of the Principality of Samos from the National Historical Museum of Athens

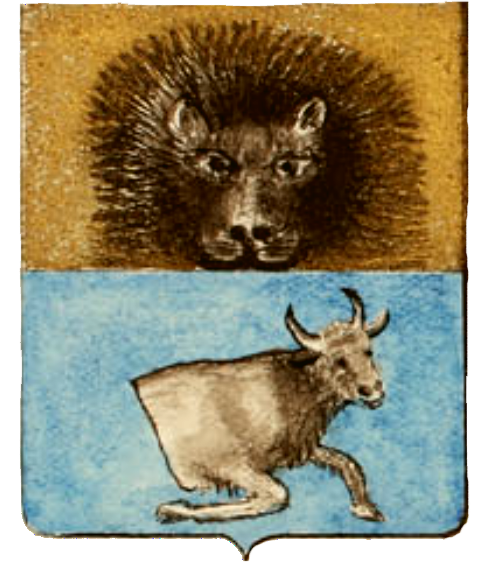
Coat of arms of Samos

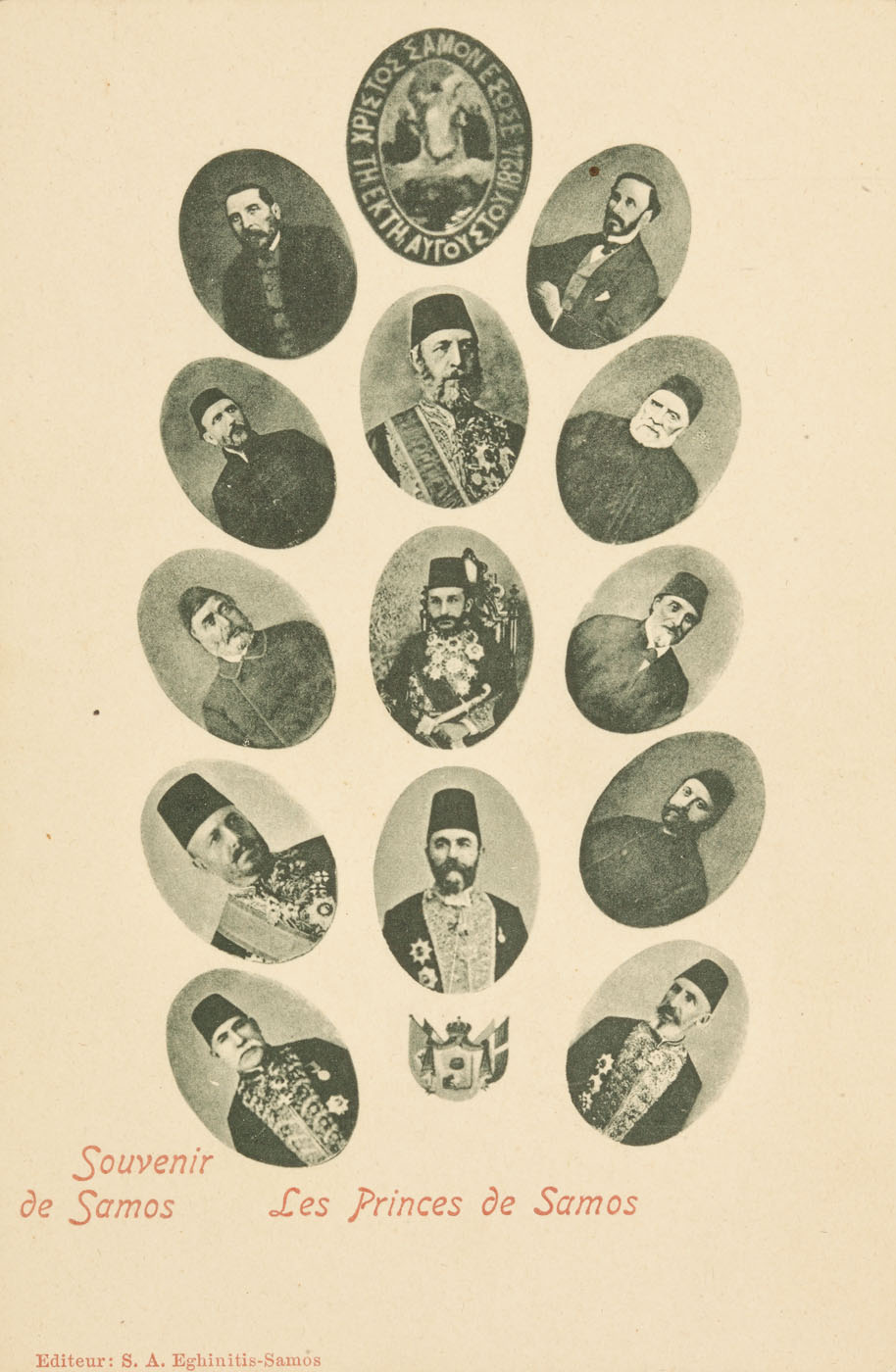
Illustration depicting the Princes of Samos from 1 January 1900

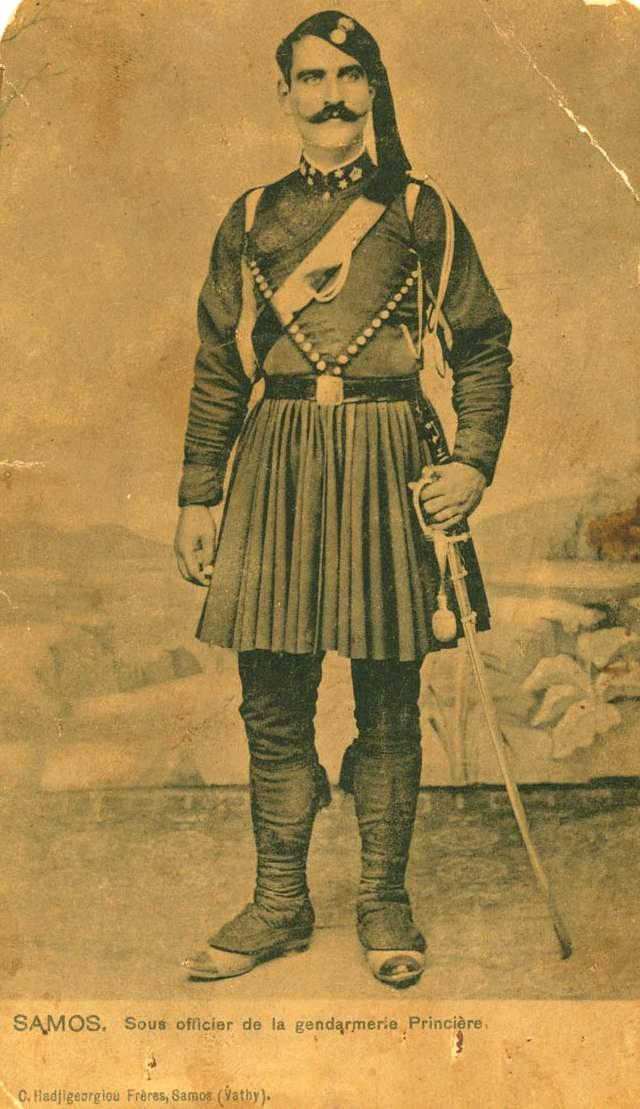
Lieutenant of the Samian Gendarmerie

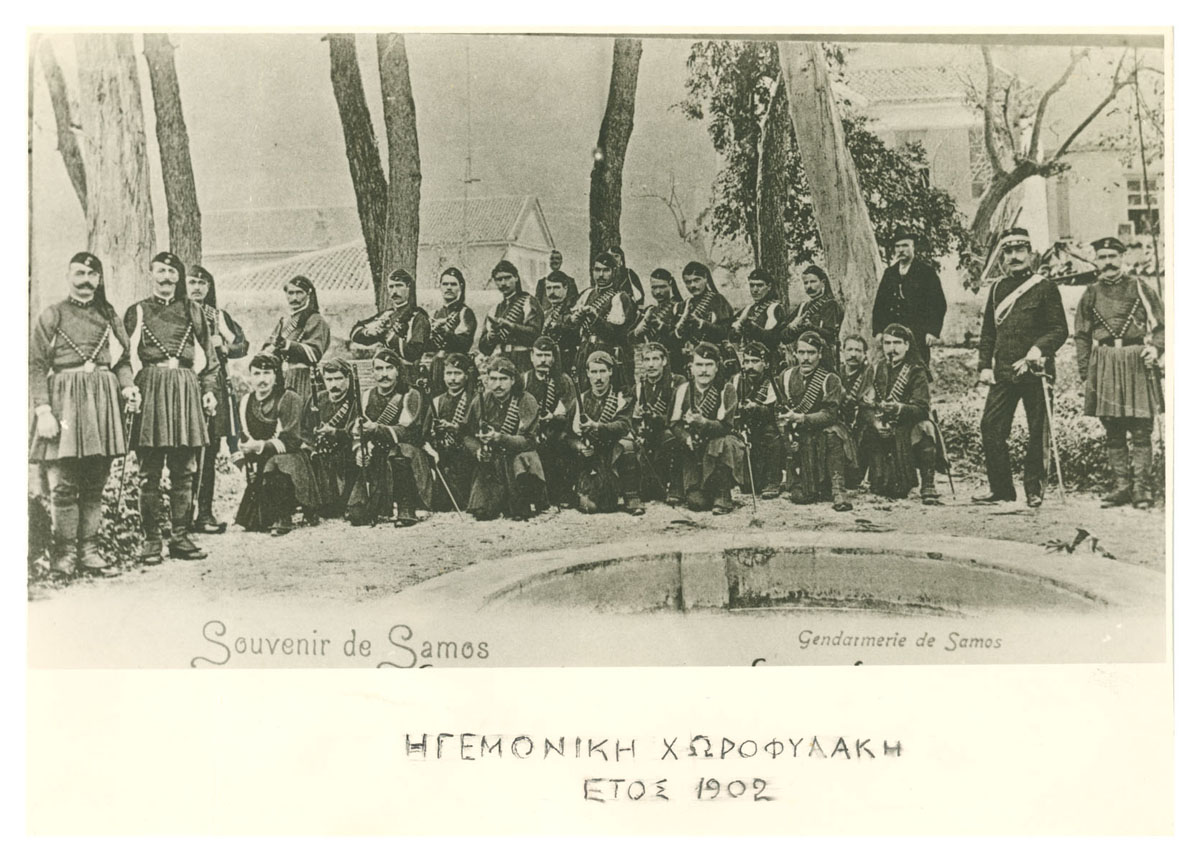
Samian Gendarmerie on a 1902 postal card

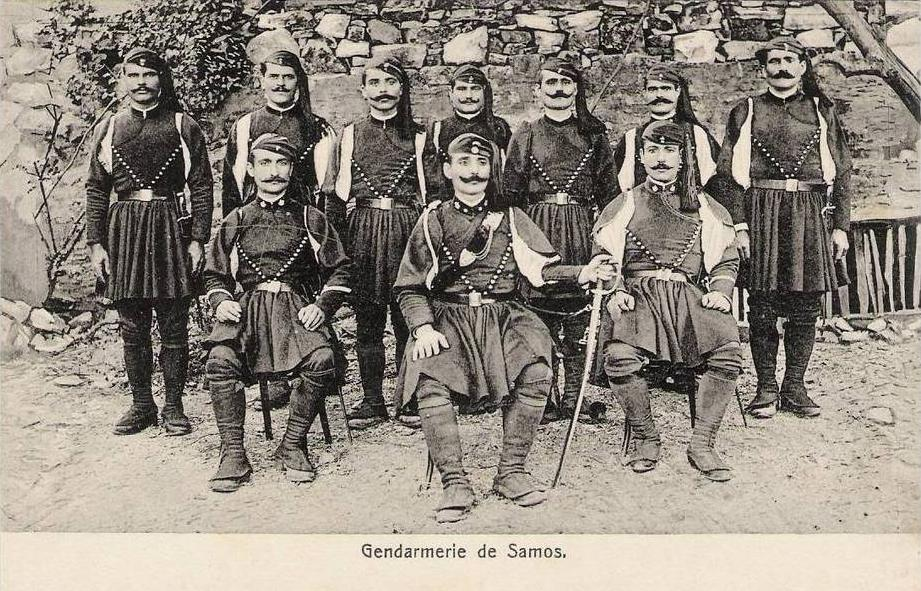
Samian Gendarmerie on a postal card

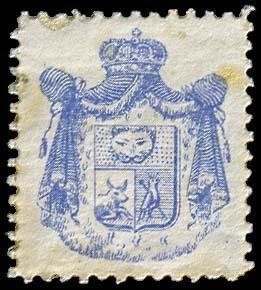
Stamp with the coat of arms of Samos

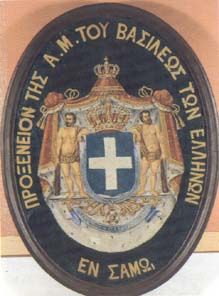
Escutcheon of the Greek Consulate on Samos

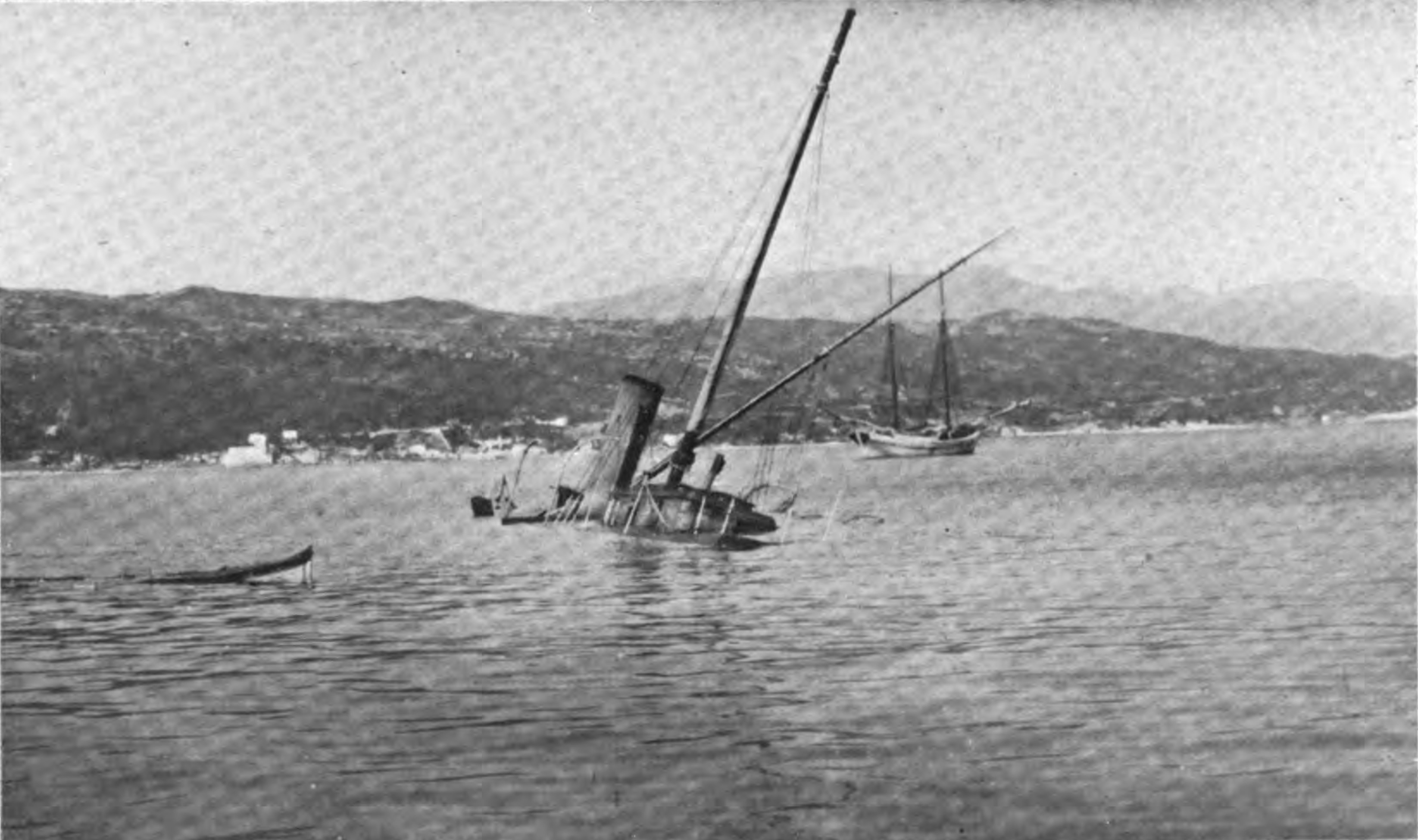
The yacht "Ih Sanieh" of the Prince of Samos, scuttled and torpedoed on 4 Aprill 1912 during the Italo-Turkish War

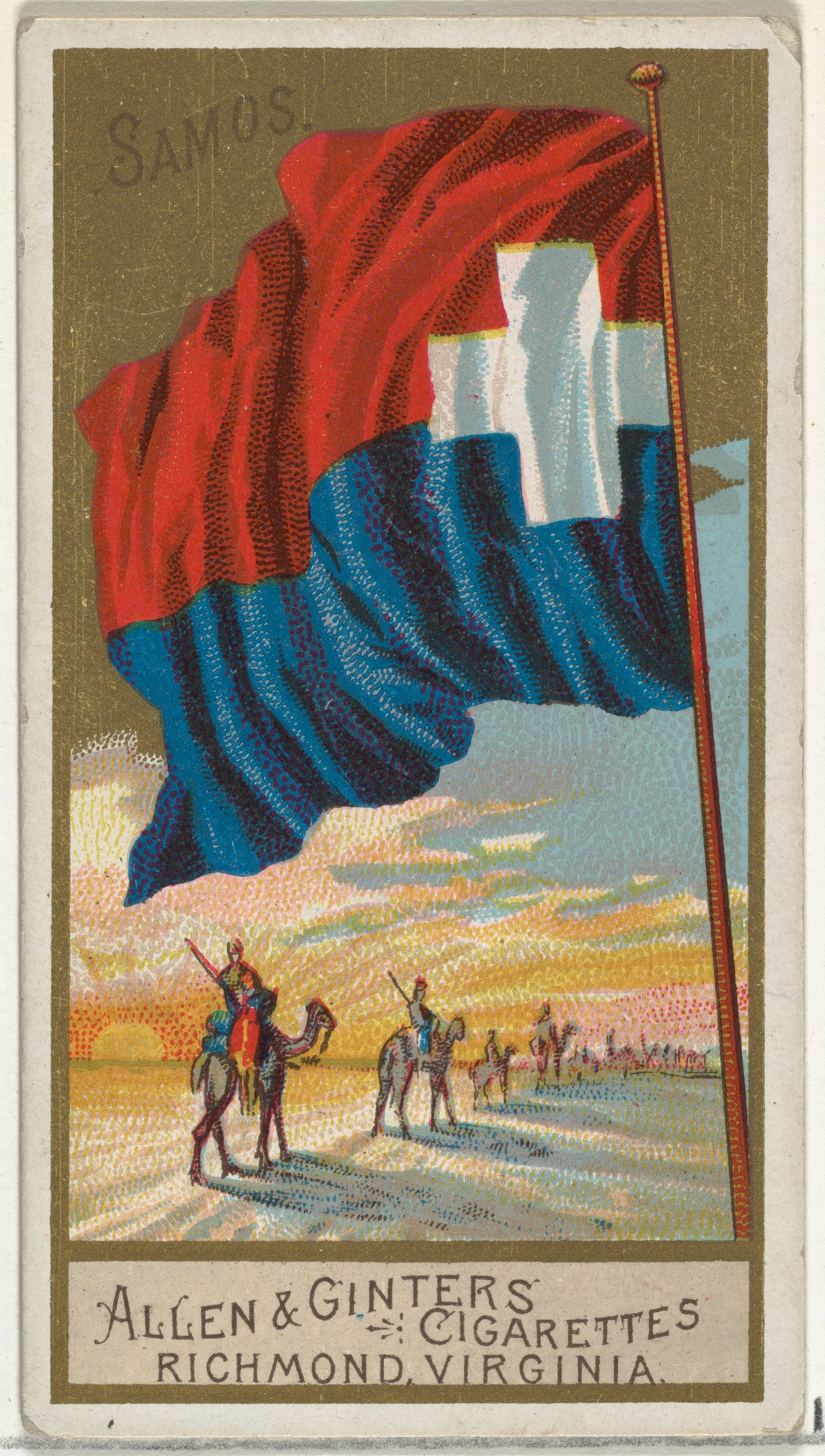
1890 cigarette advertisement depicting Samos
