= Miltiadis Aristarchis =

Miltiadis Stavraki Aristarchis
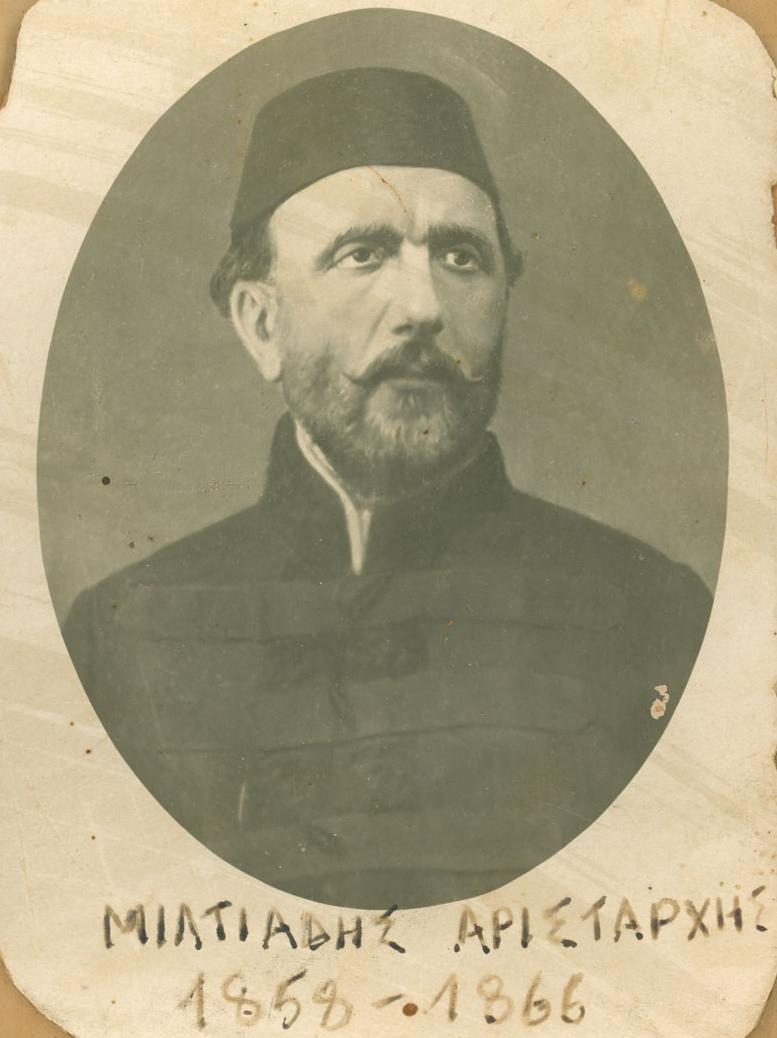

Prince of Samos
- In office 1859–1866
- Preceded by: Ion Ghica
- Succeeded by: Pavlos Mousouros

Personal details
- Born: 1809
- Died: 1893 (aged 83–84)

Miltiadis Stavraki Aristarchis was the Ottoman-appointed Prince of Samos from 1859 to 1866.

A lover of music, he finished the Pythagorio High School, and founded three more Girls' Schools in the three Samian regions, he founded the Pythagoras square (in the capital), and the Principal Garden (today the Municipal Garden).

He wished to make Tigani (now Pythagorio) the capital of the Principality of Samos; he created a port there and reordered the street layout of the town. The Samian Parliament donated some fertile land called 'Aristarches' in his honour in Kokkari to express its gratitude.

His rule, fair in the beginning, ended up strict and cruel. He changed the taxation system and made enemies out of his friends. Mitilinii even rebelled against him and the Ottoman army was used to suppress the rebellion, against the rights and privileges of the Principality and its inhabitants. He was overthrown by a popular uprising in 1866.
