= Alexander Karatheodori Pasha =

Ottoman-Greek statesman and diplomat

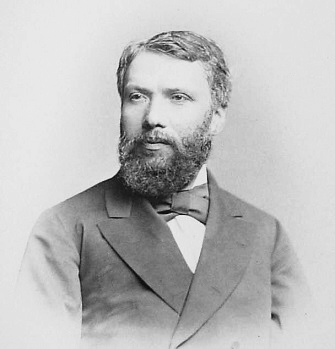

Prince of Samos
- In office 1885–1895
- Preceded by: Konstantinos Adosidis
- Succeeded by: Georgios Verovits

Wali of Crete
- In office November 1878 – December 1878
- Preceded by: Ahmed Muhtar Pasha
- Succeeded by: Ioannis Photiades Pasha

Wali of Crete
- In office May 1895 – December 1895
- Preceded by: Iskander Pasha
- Succeeded by: Turhan Pasha Përmeti

Personal details
- Born: 1833 Constantinople, Ottoman Empire
- Died: 1906 (aged 72–73) Constantinople, Ottoman Empire
- Children: Constantin Carathéodory
- Parents: Stefanos Karatheodori (father); Lokua Hanım of Mavrocordatos family, daughter of Alexandros Mavrokordatos (mother)
- Profession: Statesman

Alexander Karatheodori Pasha (Greek: Αλέξανδρος Καραθεοδωρής; 1833–1906) was an Ottoman Greek statesman and diplomat. He was involved in diplomatic affairs following the aftermath of the Russo-Turkish War of 1877–78.

== Biography ==
Born in Constantinople (now Istanbul) as a child of a leading Phanariote family. His father, Stefanos Karatheodori, was the personal physician of Sultan Mahmud II. After law studies in Paris, like many Phanariotes he pursued a career in the civil service of the Ottoman Empire. In 1874 he was appointed ambassador to Rome, and in 1878 he took part in the preliminary negotiations with Russia over the Treaty of San Stefano. Several months later was sent to Germany as the head commissioner of the Porte to the Congress of Berlin. There he was successful in changing the San Stefano peace terms in favour of the Ottoman Empire (Treaty of Berlin).

In November 1878, he was appointed Governor-General of Crete with the task of calming the island's tense situation, which had descended into near-civil war due to tensions between the Christian and Muslim inhabitants of the island. Soon however, in December 1878, he was recalled and became Ottoman Minister of Foreign Affairs, a post he held until he resigned from it in 1879.

Karatheodori finished his career as the Porte-appointed Prince of the autonomous Greek island of Samos for a full decade (1885-1895). In May 1895 he was again appointed Governor of Crete amidst renewed inter-communal tension, but was unsuccessful in restoring order and resigned in December.

He died in Constantinople. Another member of his family—his brother Konstantinos Karatheodoris (1841–1922)—later succeeded him for a brief princely rule in Samos in 1906.

Karatheodori translated a mathematical treatise by Nasir al-Din al-Tusi. His great-nephew was the mathematician Constantin Carathéodory.
