= Sharia courts in the Ottoman Empire =

Sharia courts (Note: Ottoman Turkish: محاكم شرعیه, romanized: maḥâkim-i şerʿiyye, lit. 'shariatic courts'. French-language sources of the 19th and early 20th centuries referred to these courts as tribunaux du chéri (from Ottoman Turkish شرع şerʿ, şeriʿ).) were for a long time the primary institutions responsible for applying both the sharia and law emanating from the imperial power in the Ottoman Empire. They were typically composed of a single judge (kadi) in each district (kaza), whose decisions could be appealed to the Fetvahane, the office of the Şeyhülislam. Their jurisdiction covered most civil and legal matters, although cases involving the personal status of non-Muslim subjects, such as marriage and inheritance, were generally handled by the religious courts of their respective communities.

Quoting Annette F. Timm and Joshua A. Sanborn,

Sharia courts in the Ottoman Empire, which stretched well into the Balkans during the eighteenth century, protected married women's property rights and punished men who physically assaulted women to a much higher degree than laws in Protestant or Catholic regions of Europe.

Specialized commercial courts were established in the mid-19th century, during the Tanzimat, following the promulgation of the Ottoman Commercial Code in 1860 and subsequent procedural regulations in 1861. The establishment of commercial courts marked the beginning of a broader process of secularization through law, which continued with the creation of the Nizamiye Courts system. Their foundations were laid with the 1864 Provincial Regulations, and the system was formally established in 1879. The enactement of the secular legal codes and the formation of the new secular court system "overshadowed" the sharia jurisdiction, the scope of which was eventually reduced "more or less to matters concerning personal status and waqf."

== Sources ==
- Timm, Annette F.; Sanborn, Joshua A. (2016). Gender, Sex and the Shaping of Modern Europe.
- Schull, Kent F. (2014). Prisons in the Late Ottoman Empire: Microcosms of Modernity.
