= Family law in the Ottoman Empire =

Ottoman family law is the set of regulations surrounding marriage, divorce, guardianship, and inheritance that were present during the reign of the Ottoman Empire from 1299 to 1922.

Before the Tanzimat period, family law was relegated to the private sphere and not subject to state interference due to its classification as personal status law. Different religious groups would administer family law according to the requirements of their respective religions, and the state had very little way of accounting for its subjects. Family law came under the purview of the Ottoman Empire during the Tanzimat, a period of governmental reform and centralization, fundamentally changing the Ottoman subjects' relationship with the state.

Reform to Ottoman family law during the 19th century sought to bring family law under the domain of the nascent centralized administrative system through codification. The codes of this period addressed the areas of family law that previous Tanzimat legislation did not. The short-lived Hukuk-i Aile Kararnamesi (Decree of Family Law) of 1917 was the major legal reform that established a standard family law code during the Ottoman Empire.

The provisions of the Decree of Family Law were often contradictory to provisions in other Tanzimat legislation and with Islamic law itself. The Decree is based on a mixture of the four Sunni schools of Islamic law, Hanafi, Mailiki, Shafi'i, and Hanbali.

== Legal reform ==
=== 1917 Ottoman Decree on Family Rights ===
The Hukuk-i Aile Kararnamesi (Decree of Family Law) of 1917 was an attempt by the Ottoman Empire to establish a standard, secularized family code to be applied to all Ottoman subjects.

There were several reasons for the promulgation of the Hukuk-i Aile Kararnamesi. Previous legislation, such as the Mecelle (Ottoman Civil Code) and the Edict of Gülhane, and other government reforms during the Tanzimat period, did not address family law because of its classification as personal status law. Changing social structures and international pressures from the onset of World War I provided the grounds for the promulgation of a secularized family law code. Tanzimat bureaucrats saw family law as in need of modernization and standardization to create an Ottoman national identity.

The existence of the Decree of Family Law was brief, however, only lasting from 1917 to 1919, and is generally considered a failure by Ottoman scholars. It was replaced by the Swiss Civil Code, adopted by the Turkish Republic in 1926, yet remained the basis for family law in countries such as Syria, Jordan, Lebanon, and for Palestinian Muslims in Israel, following the fall of the Ottoman Empire.

The Hukuk-i Aile Kararnamesi is considered the first codification of Islamic family law.

Motivations behind the social reform of the late Ottoman Empire originated from desires to strengthen the empire and from changing ideas about morality, familial and gender relationships, procreation, and hygiene.

== Marriage ==
=== Eligibility ===
According to the 1917 Ottoman Decree of Family Law, the minimum legal age of marriage is eighteen years old for boys and seventeen years old for girls. This stipulation contradicts the Mecelle and Islamic law, which states that the age of consent is fifteen for girls.

Familial consent is not required for men and women of marriageable age to enter into a marriage contract, however, the Decree of Family Law also stipulates that a judge will only permit a woman to marry if there are no legitimate objections from her guardians. The law also specifies an age range for puberty, with children below the threshold being considered minors and not being eligible for marriage, even with the consent of their guardian. People who are deemed mentally ill are also prohibited from marriage and cannot be married by their guardians.

=== Administration ===
Following the promulgation of the Decree of Family Law, all marriages had to be registered with the national Population Registry. Matrimony was required to be performed in court so that it could be reported to the Registry, an uncommon practice prior this new regulation. In a report from the Ottoman Council of Ministers dated 27 April 1887, it was decided that a special committee under the direction of the Governorship of Istanbul was to conduct investigations before matrimony. It is unclear what the procedure was for these investigations, but it is thought that Islamic law's requirements for marriage may have provided their basis.

== Divorce ==
The Decree of Family Law expanded grounds for divorce. Under these new regulations, a person could divorce if their spouse was afflicted with leprosy, sexually transmitted infections, or mental illness, along with impotence remaining as legal grounds for divorce.

A wife can divorce her husband if he abandons her without leaving alimony. If the husband abandons her while leaving alimony, she may divorce him if he does not return after four years. A wife may also divorce her husband if he goes missing or is captured during a war.

Incompatibility also serves as legal grounds for divorce. An arbitration committee is formed, composed of members of the families of the parties involved, to mediate spousal disputes. If they are unable to reach a consensus, the arbitration committee decides whether there should be a mutual divorce or a divorce at the fault of either the husband or the wife.

Divorce initiated by a drunk person is deemed invalid.

== Bibliography ==
- Dannies, Kate; Hock, Stefan (2020-05). "A Prolonged Abrogation? The Capitulations, the 1917 Law of Family Rights, and the Ottoman Quest for Sovereignty during World War 1". International Journal of Middle East Studies. 52 (2): 245–260. doi:10.1017/S002074382000001X. ISSN 0020-7438
- Demirci, Tuba (2006). "Family, State and the Blurring of the Public and Private; Ottoman State and the Emergence of "Marriage Proper" in the Second Half of the Nineteenth Century State and Blurrring of the Public and Private". Social Behaviour and Family Strategies in the Balkans,: 205–248 – via Academia.
