= Mecelle =

Ottoman Empire civil code of 1877

Title page of the Mecelle in Ottoman Turkish

Title page of the Mecelle in French (Code civil ottoman), published by Demetrius Nicolaides

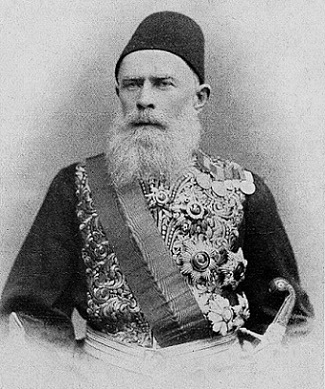
Ahmed Cevdet Pasha (1822–1895), the lead author of the Mecelle

The Mecelle was the civil code of the Ottoman Empire in the late 19th and early 20th century. It is the first codification of Sharia law by an Islamic nation.

== Title ==
The Ottoman Turkish title of the code is مجلۀ احكام عدلیە (Mecelle-i Aḥkâm-ı ʿAdliye, lit. 'Code of Judicial Rules'), which derives from the Arabic مجلة الأحكام العدلية (Majallat al-ʾAḥkām al-ʿAdliyya). The Arabic word مجلة (majalla) can mean a law code or a bound text in general.

It has also been transliterated in European languages as Mejelle, Majalla, Medjelle, or Meğelle. In French, it is known as the Medjellé (French pronunciation: [mɛdʒɛle]) or the Code civil ottoman.

== History ==
=== Enactment ===
The code was prepared by a commission headed by Ahmed Cevdet Pasha, including a large team of scholars, issued in sixteen volumes (containing 1,851 articles) from 1869 to 1876 and entered into force in the year 1877. In its structure and approach it was clearly influenced by the earlier European codifications. Family law, which had been originally exempted and left in the domain of religious courts, eventually became a part of it in 1917, as the Law of Family Rights. It has been praised as the first successful rendition of Hanafi fiqh into legal civil code comprehensible to the layperson belonging to any religious ideology and not just to Islamic scholars.

The substance of the code was based on the Hanafi legal tradition that enjoyed official status in the Empire, put into European code-form. However, using the method of preference (Istihsan), it also incorporated other legal opinions that were considered more appropriate to the time, including from non-Hanafis.

As the Mecelle was eventually applied in the secular Nizamiye Courts (lit. 'regular courts') as well as in the Sharia courts of the Empire, Jews and Christians were for the first time subjected to Islamic law instead of their own law, but could now be called as witnesses in court.

=== Post-Ottoman application ===
After the dissolution of the Ottoman Empire following World War I, the Mecelle remained a lasting influence in most of its successor states (except Egypt, where it was never in force). The Mecelle was long-lasting in most places since it was effective, coherent, and difficult to dislodge. It remained in force:

- in Turkey until 1926, when it was replaced by the Turkish Civil Code
- in Albania until 1928
- in Lebanon until 1932
- in Syria until 1949
- in Iraq until 1953
- in Cyprus until the 1960s
- in the British Mandate for Palestine and, later, Israel formally until 1984, although individual laws had gradually superseded it during the Mandate as well as in the 1960s and '70s

In Bosnia and Herzegovina, the Mecelle was slowly replaced with the Austrian General Civil Code after the Austro-Hungarian rule in Bosnia and Herzegovina began in 1878. But some provisions remained in force even after 1918, until the abolishment of state Sharia courts in 1946.

The Mecelle also remained the basis of civil law in Jordan and Kuwait.

== Overview ==
=== Book 1: Sale ===
The first book of the Mecelle is composed of seven chapters that focus on the jurisprudence and codification of laws regarding sale. These include standards of contracts, the subject matter of sales, matters relating to price, giving and taking delivery, and various categories of things sold and the effect thereof.

=== Book 2: Hire ===
Book 2 is the legal codification of circumstances dealing with hire (renting). This book contains general hire specifications, questions relating to the contract of hire, questions relating to the amount of the hire, period of the hire, type of thing hired and matters relating thereto, rights and obligations of person giving and person taking on hire after the conclusion of contract, and matters of compensation.

=== Book 3: Guarantee ===
Book 3 deals with legal guarantee. This includes matters of contractual agreement and release from a contract of guarantee.

=== Book 4: Transfer of Debt ===
This book includes matters of contracts dealing in transfer of debts.

=== Book 5: Pledges ===
A pledge consists of setting aside property from which it is possible to obtain payment or satisfaction of some claim. Such property is then said to be pledged, or given in pledge. Book 5 includes the fundamental basis of the contract of the pledge, stipulations of the pledgor and pledgee, fundamental rules relating to the pledge, and sale of the pledge.

=== Book 6: Trust and Trusteeship ===
This book contains all legal information regarding trusts and trusteeship. A trust involves something that is entrusted to one person from another person for safe keeping. Trusts can also involve the loaning of something for use, meaning that the one accepting the loan is to enjoy use in the subject of the trust. This section includes general conditions of trusteeship, as well as stipulations for depositing for safe keeping and loaning for use

=== Book 7: Gift ===
A gift consists of bestowing the ownership of property upon some other person without receiving anything in return. This section consists of two chapters that outline matters relating to the contract of gift and fundamental rules relating to gift, such as guidelines for the revocation of a gift.

=== Book 8: Wrongful Appropriation and Destruction ===
Wrongful appropriation is when a person takes and keeps another person's property without the owner's consent. This book is composed of law regarding wrongful appropriation and destruction of one's property by another. This book also defines direct and indirect destruction of property and the legal ramifications associated with each type of property destruction.

=== Book 9: Interdiction, Constraint and Pre-emption ===
In this book, interdiction, constraint, and pre-emption are legally codified where interdiction consists of prohibiting any particular person from dealing with his own property; Constraint consists of wrongfully forcing a person through fear to do something without his consent. Pre-emption consists of acquiring possession of property which has been purchased, by paying the purchaser what he paid for it. This book defines matters relating to the interdiction of minors, lunatics, and imbeciles, as well as prodigals and debtors. In regards to pre-emption, this book includes conditions attaching to the right of pre-emption, the claim of pre-emption, and the effect of pre-emption.

=== Book 10: Joint Ownership ===
This book is composed of law regarding joint ownership, in which a thing belongs absolutely to more than one individual. In this book, there is a distinction made between two classes of joint ownership. The first class is when joint ownership arises due to purchase or gift. The second class is when joint ownership comes about through contract and agreement of parties in the joint ownership. This book is composed of eight chapters including legal code on partition, walls and neighbors, jointly owned property which is free, joint expenses, and partnership.

=== Book 11: Agency ===
Book 11 is based on agency, which consists of one person empowering another person to perform some act for him. This book is composed of three chapters regarding the fundamental basis and classification of agency, conditions attaching to agency, and essential elements of agency.

=== Book 12: Settlement and Release ===
This book divides settlement into three parts and release into two parts. Settlement: The first part consists of a settlement by admission of the defendant. The second part consists of a settlement by denial of the defendant. The third part consists of a settlement by the silence of the defendant consequent upon the absence of any admission or denial. Release: The first part consists of release by way of renunciation of a right. The second consists of release by admission of payment. This book includes chapters dealing with conclusion of a contract of settlement and release, the consideration and subject matter of the settlement, the subject matter of the settlement, and fundamental conditions governing settlement and release.

=== Book 13: Admissions ===
This book is composed of law regarding conditions governing admissions, the validity of an admission, the effect of an admission, and written admissions.

=== Book 14: Actions ===
This book is based on actions, where an action is a claim against a person made by another person in court. This book includes conditions and fundamental rules relating to an action and the defense, as well as limitations to actions.

=== Book 15: Evidence and Administration of an Oath ===
This book is composed of four chapters that include law on the nature of evidence, documentary evidence and presumptive evidence, administering an oath, and preferred evidence and administration of an oath to both parties.

=== Book 16: Administration of Justice by the Courts ===
This final book of the Mecelle is based on the legal administration of justice including codification of judges, judgement, retrial, and arbitration.

== Translations ==
The first volume of the Greek translation of the Mecelle, by Konstantinos Photiadis and Ioannis Vithynos

The French version of the Mecelle is available in Législation ottomane, ou Recueil des lois, règlements, ordonnances, traités, capitulations et autres documents officiels de l´Empire ottoman, a collection of Ottoman law edited by Demetrius Nicolaides and published by Gregory Aristarchis. Mecelle is in volumes 6-7, which do not include Aristarchis's name. According to Johann Strauss, author of "A Constitution for a Multilingual Empire," these two volumes "seem to have been edited solely by Demetrius Nicolaides". G. Sinapian, a scholar of Turkish studies and a jurist of Armenian descent, translated the eight chapters of the Mecelle in volume 7. For Livre des Preuves he used work by Ohannes Bey Alexanian as a basis. L. Rota, a lawyer of Constantinople (now Istanbul), translated other parts, assisted by Alexander Adamides.

A Greek version, Nomikoi kanones ētoi Astykos Kōdēx (Νομικοί κανόνες ήτοι Αστυκός Κώδηξ), was translated by Konstantinos Photiadis, and Ioannis Vithynos, and was released from 1873 to 1881. Both men were well-versed in Ottoman Turkish. Johann Strauss, author of "A Constitution for a Multilingual Empire: Translations of the Kanun-ı Esasi and Other Official Texts into Minority Languages", wrote that "The translation [...] was a demanding task" which "required abundant notes." Nicolaides also made his own Greek translation; the Sultan of the Ottoman Empire Abdulhamid II gave Nicolaides, through the Ottoman Internal Affairs fund, 5,000 piastres due to the translations of the legal documents.

Nicolaides also wrote a document stating that he translated volumes of the Mecelle and the Düstur into Bulgarian. He lacked funds to publish the entire collection; vilayet council leaders agreed to fund the distribution of these volumes. He had translated two volumes which together had half of the Düstur and Mecelle laws at the time.
