= Ministry of Justice (Ottoman Empire) =

Imperial ministry of the Ottoman Empire

Ministry of Judicial Affairs
- Ottoman Turkish: امورِ عدليه نظارتی; Umur-ı Adliyye Nezâreti

Agency overview
- Formed: 1879
- Superseding agency: Ministry of Judicial Affairs of the Republic of Turkey (2 May 1920)
- Jurisdiction: Ottoman Empire
- Headquarters: Constantinople
- Minister responsible: Midhat Pasha ( 1879 )

The Ministry of Justice (Ottoman Turkish: عدليه نظارتی; Turkish: Adliyye Nezâreti) was the justice ministry of the Ottoman Empire, based in Constantinople (now Istanbul). It also served as the Ministry of Religions.

It was established in 1879 as part of a reorganisation of the empire's legal system. Non-Muslim ecclesiastical authorities relied on the ministry. The ministry took control of the commercial courts and commercial appeal courts from the Ministry of Commerce.

== Organization ==
By 1900, the Ministry of Justice included the following high courts:

- Supreme Judicial Council (Encümen-i Adliye)
- Court of Cassation (Mahkeme-i Temyiz), with civil, criminal, and administrative sections.
- Appeals Court (Mahkeme-i Istinaf), with criminal, civil, correctional, and commercial justice sections.
  - Court for the First Instance for Istanbul (Der Saadet Bidayet Mahkemesi)
  - Tribunal of Commerce (Mahkeme-i Ticaret)

The ministry was responsible for administering secular Nizamiye Courts, training judges, and supervizing secular legal education.

== Successor ==
Ministry of Justice (Turkey) currently governs affairs in Turkey.

== See also ==
- Ioannis Vithynos
- Supreme Council of Judicial Ordinances, its predecessor
