= Georgios Georgiadis (Prince of Samos) =

Ottoman governor of Samos, 1907–1908

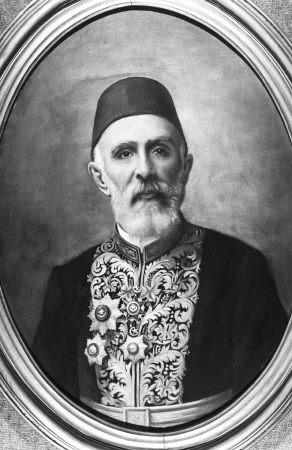

Prince of Samos
- In office August 1907 – January 1908
- Preceded by: Konstantinos Karatheodoris
- Succeeded by: Andreas Kopasis

Personal details
- Born: 1866
- Died: 1943 (aged 76–77)

Georgios Georgiadis was the Ottoman-appointed Prince of Samos who reigned briefly from 1907 to 1908.

== Biography ==
Georgiadis was born in 1866 to a Greek family who were natives of Prokopi, near Niğde in Cappadocia (modern Ürgüp, central Turkey). After being appointed Prince, he came to the island, but he realized that a civil war was about to break out. To avoid fighting his own people, he gave his resignation to the Ottoman Sultan. When he left, he told the Samian Parliament : "Fellow Samians, I am leaving because I don't want to execute the illegal orders of the Ottoman government. I hope that I will not be replaced by Andreas Kopasis". However, that is exactly what happened.
