= Nizamiye Courts =

Secular court system introduced within the Ottoman Empire during the Tanzimat era

The Nizamiye Courts (Note: Also Nizami Courts.) or Regular Courts (Ottoman Turkish: محاكم نظامیه, romanized: Maḥâkim-i Niẓâmiyye, lit. 'regular courts') (Note: Less often called نظامیه محكمه‌لری Niẓâmiyye Maḥkemeleri in Ottoman Turkish.) were a secular court system introduced in the Ottoman Empire during the Tanzimat era. Their foundations were laid with the 1864 Provincial Regulations, and the system was formally established in 1879. They were created as an alternative to the existing sharia courts (Ottoman Turkish: محاكم شرعیه, romanized: maḥâkim-i şerʿiyye, lit. 'shariatic courts').

The Nizamiye Courts drew much influence from French models at the time. They were administered under the Ottoman Ministry of Justice. These courts enabled the further growth of legal pluralism within Ottoman jurisprudence. Although secular, the Mecelle (the Ottoman version of codified Sharia) was eventually applied to the courts.

== History ==
From 1839 onwards various legal changes were implemented in the Ottoman Empire with heavy French influence. For example, the penal code (in Turkish ceza kanunnamesi) from 1840 was revised in 1851 and later replaced by a French legal code. The French legal code also determined the Ottoman legal codes of commerce (1850) and maritime commerce (1863). By the 1860s, secular Nizamiye Courts were introduced in order to enact this new form of legal practice. The Nizamiye Courts were first established in 1864 as a part of the extensive Tanzimat efforts meant to Westernize and modernize the Ottoman Empire. During this time period the Khedivial Law School was founded for the sake of training lawyers for the Nizamiye Courts.

William L. Cleveland, an American historian of the Middle East, writes

The new penal laws were a continuation of the work of the jurist, religious scholar, and civil functionary, Ahmed Cevdet Pasha. In a series of reforms, Cevdet Pasha arranged for the establishment of secular, or Nizami courts with their own judiciary and courts of appeal.”

Out of this court system rose a duality within Ottoman legal practice. The Sharia Courts and Nizamiye Courts coexisted creating legal pluralism within the Empire. In some ways, this led to the slippery slope of increasing a lawyer's ability to choose within the legal sphere leading to corruption.

With regards to this pluralism, law professor Lee Epstein states that,

In an attempt to clarify the division of judicial competences, an administrative council laid down that religious matters were to be handled by religious courts, and statute matters were to be handled by the Nizamiye courts.

== Structure ==
The courts were based on French models and were European in style. Therefore, they contained a three-tier hierarchal arrangement. This system was extended to the local magistrate level with the final promulgation of the Mecelle, a civil code that regulated marriage, divorce, alimony, will, and other matters of personal status.

The three levels (dealing with commercial, criminal and civil cases):

- First level: the Courts of First Instance (محاكم بدایت Maḥâkim-i Bidâyet), located in each kaza and sanjak's capital, each composed of a president (محكمۀ بدایت رئیسی Maḥkeme-i Bidâyet Reʾîsî) and two judges. The tribunal in the sanjak's capital could receive appeals from any kaza's tribunal.
- Second level: the Courts of Appeals (محاكم استیناف Maḥâkim-i İstînâf), located in each vilayet's capital, each composed of a president (محكمۀ استیناف رئیسی Maḥkeme-i İstînâf Reʾîsî) and four judges.
- Third level: the Court of Cassation (محكمۀ تمییز Maḥkeme-i Temyîz), located in Istanbul.

== See also ==
- Mecelle
- Sharia
- Legal pluralism

== Sources ==
- İhsanoğlu, Ekmeleddin (2001). History of the Ottoman State, Society & Civilisation.
- Schull, Kent F. (2014). Prisons in the Late Ottoman Empire: Microcosms of Modernity.
