= Ferruh =

Ferruh is a unisex given name. Notable people with the name are as follows:

- Ali Ferruh Bey, Ottoman Empire diplomat
- Ferruh Bozbeyli (1927–2019), Turkish politician
- Ferruh Güpgüp (1891–1951), Turkish politician
