= Ottoman Empire–United States relations =

- Ottoman Empire: United States

Diplomatic mission
- Embassy of the Ottoman Empire, Washington D.C.: Embassy of the United States, Istanbul

The relations between the Ottoman Empire and the United States have a long history, with roots before American independence due to long-standing trade between the two regions. After the American independence in 1776, the first relations between these two countries started through the contact between the American merchants, statesmen and lastly the Navy and North African countries (under the rule of the Ottomans at that time) and with the Ottoman Empire after 1780.

== History of relations ==
=== American tribute to the Ottoman Empire ===
On September 5, 1795, Joseph Donaldson, Junior, appointed by then 1st Minister of US to Portugal David Humphreys, signed the Treaty of Algiers with Hassan Bashaw, Dey of Algiers. According to this treaty, the USA would pay 642,000 gold one-time and 12,000 Ottoman gold ($21,600) per year for the no war against America and in exchange of extradition of prisoners in Algeria and the lack of touching any ship carrying the US banner both in the Atlantic Ocean and in the Mediterranean. It is the only U.S. document in its history to acknowledge the payment of taxes to a foreign state, as well as the only treaty in a foreign language in more than two centuries of history. The USA remained loyal to this 22-article treaty until 1818.

However, the first contact between the United States and the Ottoman central government took place when Captain William Bainbridge of the USS George Washington of the American Navy had to sail to Constantinople in 1800 upon being compelled by the Dey of Algiers to deliver the Dey's gifts and envoy to the Ottoman Sultan and Bainbridge arrive in Istanbul on November 9, 1800, marking the first direct encounter of the United States and Ottoman government.

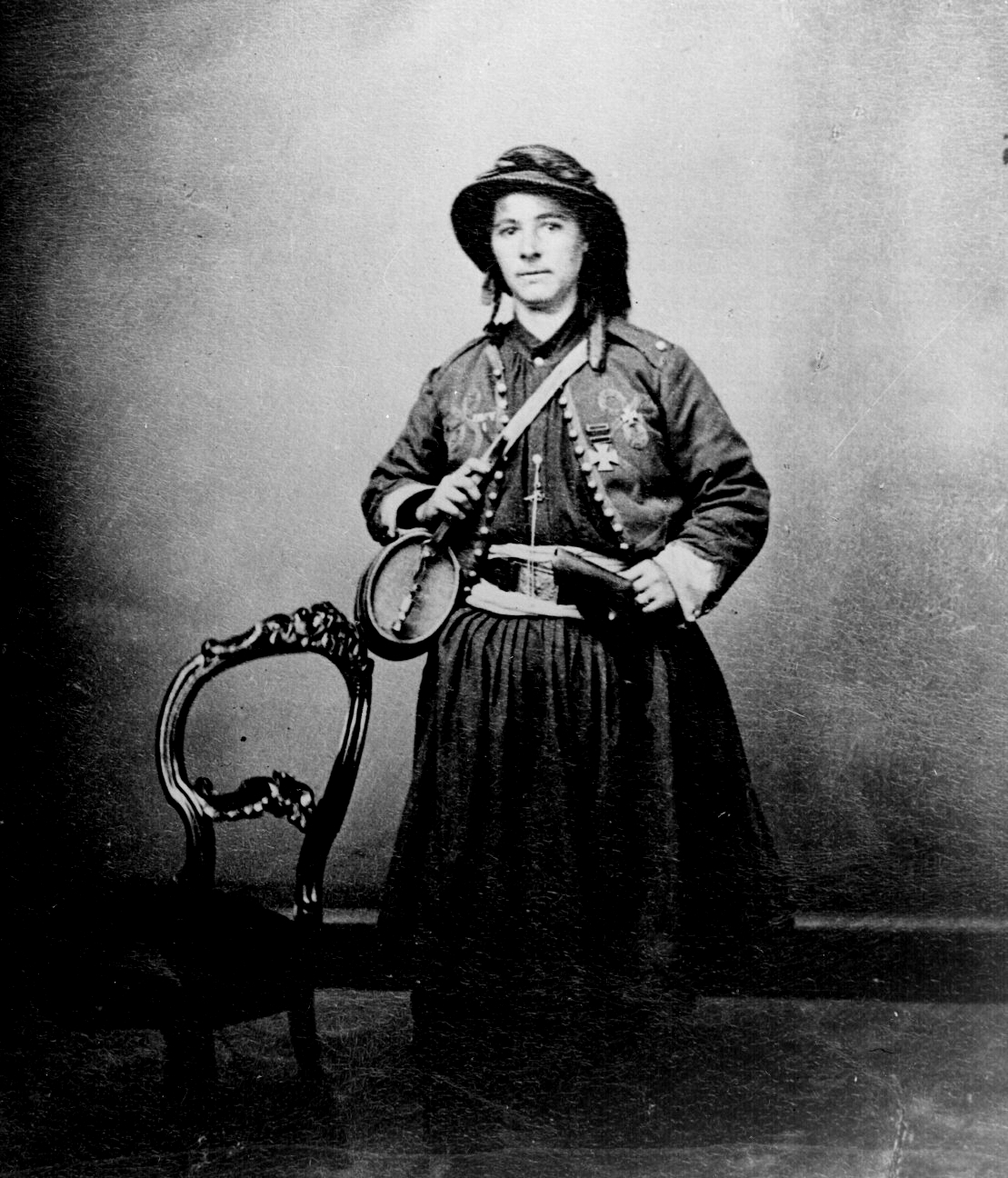
Marie Tepe, half-French half-Turkish soldier that fought for Union during American Civil War

=== Melungeon ===
Melungeon is an ethnic group in Appalachia that claimed to have Turkish ancestors by some scholars.

=== Turks of South Carolina ===
South Carolina Secession Flag

Turks of South Carolina, also known as Sumter Turks, are a group of people who have lived in the general area of Sumter County, South Carolina since the late 18th century. According to Professor Glen Browder, "they have always been a tight-knit and isolated community of people who identified as being of Turkish descent". The "Turk" community traces its history back to an early settler from the Ottoman Empire, Joseph Benenhaley, who reputedly served the colonial cause in the American Revolutionary War. He made his way to South Carolina, where he served as a scout for General Thomas Sumter during the American Revolution. General Sumter then gave Benenhaley land on his plantation to farm and raise a family. A few outsiders married into the family, but most who identified with the ostracized community, and their progeny considered themselves people of Turkish descent. By the mid-20th century, they numbered several hundred.

=== US Barbary Wars ===
In the early 19th century, the US fought the Barbary Wars against the Barbary states, which were under Ottoman suzerainty.

In 1825, during the Greek War of Independence and Greek civil wars of 1823-1825, the U.S. Navy conducted anti-piracy operations in the Aegean Sea. Greece and the Aegean were controlled by the Ottomans until Greece achieved independence in 1829. The first draft of the Monroe Doctrine, written in 1823, included a passage praising the Greek revolutionaries, though the passage was ultimately removed.

In 1831 the U.S. sent its first formally approved envoy to the Ottoman Empire, David Porter. The empire and the U.S. at that point had their representatives at the "Envoy Extraordinary and Minister Plenipotentiary" level. Sinan Kuneralp, author of "Ottoman Diplomatic and Consular Personnel in the United States of America, 1867–1917," wrote that the empire initially apparently lacked "any sensible justification" to open a mission stateside due to the relative distance between the countries. Wasti wrote that "there was no real rush on the Ottoman side to send diplomatic envoys to Washington, DC".

The first official Ottoman government visit to the U.S., lasting for six months in 1850, was that of Emin Bey, who toured shipyards there. Two Ottoman officials, one being Edouard Blak Bey, who sensed the rise of the United States, unsuccessfully advocated for installing a mission in the U.S. during the early 1850s. The first Ottoman honorary consulate in the U.S. opened in May 1858.

In 1866 Ottoman foreign minister Mehmed Emin Âli Pasha declined to start a legation to the U.S. that year, after reviewing a proposal by Ambassador to France of the Ottoman Empire Safvet Pasha. However the ministry changed its mind after the leaders there perceived the reports of the Cretan revolt (1866–1869) from the US consul W.J. Stillman and other American reports to be misleading and decided they needed to present a counter-view. The empire sent its first permanent envoy to the U.S. in 1867, creating the Ottoman Legation in Washington, DC. Since the empire itself began establishing its diplomatic missions in the 1830s and due to the about three decade gap between the respective legations being established, Kuneralp wrote that the Ottomans created their U.S. mission "comparatively late".

Blak was the first envoy to Washington. Kuneralp wrote that the Washington posting was not considered important to the Ottoman government, which is why some officials refused the posting and those considered promising were turned away from it. He cited the cases of then-minister to Florence Rüstem Bey and Osman Nizami Pasha, who declined in 1867 and 1912, respectively. Nine envoys headed the legation beginning in 1877 and prior to full embassy status, and there were a total of 13 envoys/ambassadors in the position. Author Elizabeth R. Varon wrote that the US, in the late 1800s, had little power of persuasion over the Ottoman Empire, handicapping the power of US minister to the empire James Longstreet.

Mustafa Shekib Bey, in 1904, recommended that the Ottomans appoint Levantine Armand Guys as the first commercial attaché, arguing that commercial relations had increased.

In 1906 the U.S. upgraded its representation in Constantinople to the embassy level.

The most important aspect of American diplomacy in the late 19th century, down to 1914, involved protection of the hundreds of American Protestant missionaries to the Ottoman Empire.

=== Armenian issues ===
Abdul Hamid II disliked it when the Americans pleaded for help for Armenians. As a result, he terminated the credentials of envoy Mustafa Shekib, and chose not to upgrade the mission to embassy status. Shekib therefore was unable to present his credentials to the President. Shekib slept in the daytime, and so his staff dealt with U.S. officials. Kuneralp stated that therefore "Things were eased out".

=== Moro rebellion in the Philippines ===
In 1899, John Hay, the American Secretary of State, asked the Jewish American ambassador to the Ottoman Empire, Oscar Straus to request Sultan Abdul Hamid II to write a letter to the Moro Sulu Muslims of the Sulu Sultanate in the Philippines telling them to submit to American suzerainty and American military rule (see Philippine–American War). The Sultan obliged and wrote the letter, which was sent to Sulu via Mecca; two Sulu chiefs delivered it to Sulu and it was successful since the "Sulu Mohammedans... refused to join the insurrectionists and had placed themselves under the control of our army, thereby recognizing American sovereignty."

Abdul Hamid used his position as caliph to order the Sulu Sultan not to resist and not fight the invading Americans. President McKinley did not mention the Ottoman role in the pacification of the Sulu Moros in his address to the first session of the 56th Congress in December 1899 since the agreement with the Sultan of Sulu was not submitted to the Senate until December 18. Despite Sulu's "pan-Islamic" ideology, he readily acceded to Straus' request to avoid hostilities between the West and Muslims. The Sulu sultan was persuaded by the Ottoman Sultan.

John P. Finley wrote that,

"After due consideration of these facts, the Sultan, as Caliph caused a message to be sent to the Mohammedans of the Philippine Islands forbidding them to enter into any hostilities against the Americans, inasmuch as no interference with their religion would be allowed under American rule. As the Moros have never asked more than that, it is not surprising, that they refused all overtures made, by Aguinaldo's agents, at the time of the Filipino insurrection. President McKinley sent a personal letter of thanks to Mr. Straus for the excellent work he had done, and said, its accomplishment had saved the United States at least twenty thousand troops in the field. If the reader will pause to consider what this means in men and also the millions in money, he will appreciate this wonderful piece of diplomacy, in averting a holy war."

The Muslim peoples obeyed the order.

In 1904, the Moro Rebellion then broke out between the Americans and Moro Muslims.

=== The Church of Jesus Christ of Latter-day Saints in Turkey ===
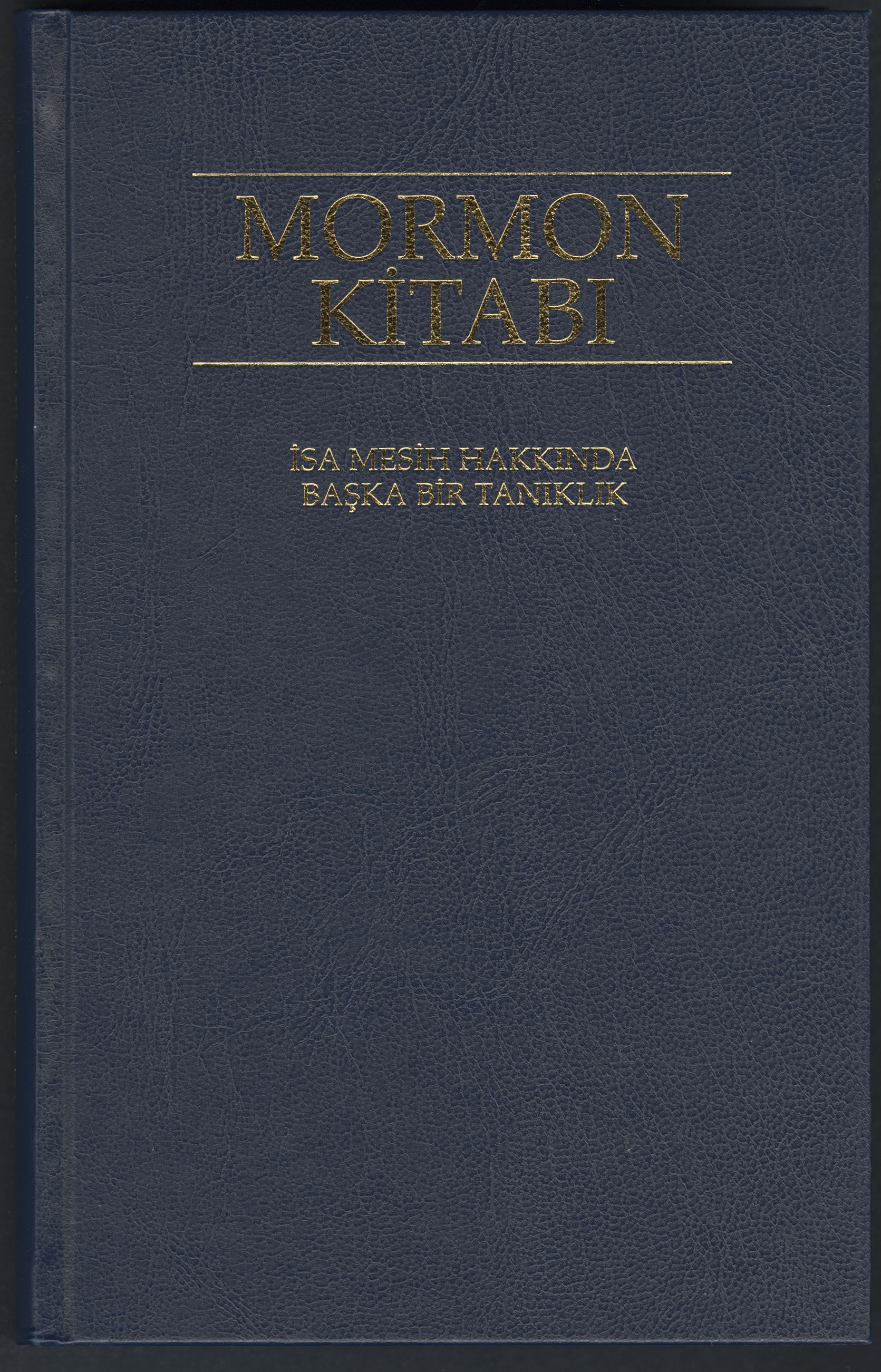
The Turkish translation of the Book of Mormon

Latter-day Saint British soldiers met in Turkey in May 1854. The first Latter-day Saint sent by the church was Jacob Spori who arrived in Constantinople on December 31, 1854. Shortly after, on January 4, 1885, Hadop and Philimae Vartooguain and their two children, Sisak and Armais, were baptized. The first group meeting was held on January 18, 1885. Missionaries were sent to Aintab in April 1889 with a branch being established soon after. A church school was established in Aintab in the fall of 1898. The Book of Mormon was translated into Turkish in 1906. Due to hostilities, members were evacuated on September 16, 1921.

=== Young Turk Revolution ===
The Young Turk Revolution removed Abdul Hamid II from power in 1908, and officials friendlier to the U.S. replaced him. The Ottoman Legation in Washington was designated as an embassy in 1909, and given the second class ranking; the Ottoman Empire at the time ranked its embassies by importance.

During the Presidency of William Howard Taft, an American strategy was to become involved in business transactions rather than military confrontations, a policy known as Dollar Diplomacy. It failed with respect to the Ottoman Empire because of opposition from US ambassador Oscar Straus and to Turkish vacillation under pressure from the entrenched European powers who did not wish to see American competition. American trade remained a minor factor.

=== World War I and the Armenian genocide ===
Henry Morgenthau, Sr. was the U.S. Ambassador to the Ottoman Empire during World War I until 1916. Morgenthau criticized the ruling Three Pashas for the Armenian genocide and sought to get help for the Armenians. Jesse B. Jackson, consul in Aleppo, also assisted Armenians.

Morgenthau's replacement Abram Isaac Elkus, served in 1916–1917.

The Ottomans severed diplomatic relations with the United States on April 20, 1917, after the United States had declared war against Germany on April 4, 1917. The United States never declared war on the Ottoman Empire.

On January 28, 1919, Mark Lambert Bristol began serving as the High Commissioner for Turkey. He served in this role through the end of the Ottoman Empire and the beginning of the Republic of Turkey, the Ottoman Empire's successor state. Thomas A. Bryson of West Georgia College wrote that in 1919 "the United States enjoyed a benevolent reputation in Turkey" due to missionary work done by Americans and because the United States did not declare war on the empire. He also stated that Bristol had "built up a large deposit of Turkish good will for the United States".

Bristol's role ended in 1927, when normal diplomatic relations were established with Turkey.

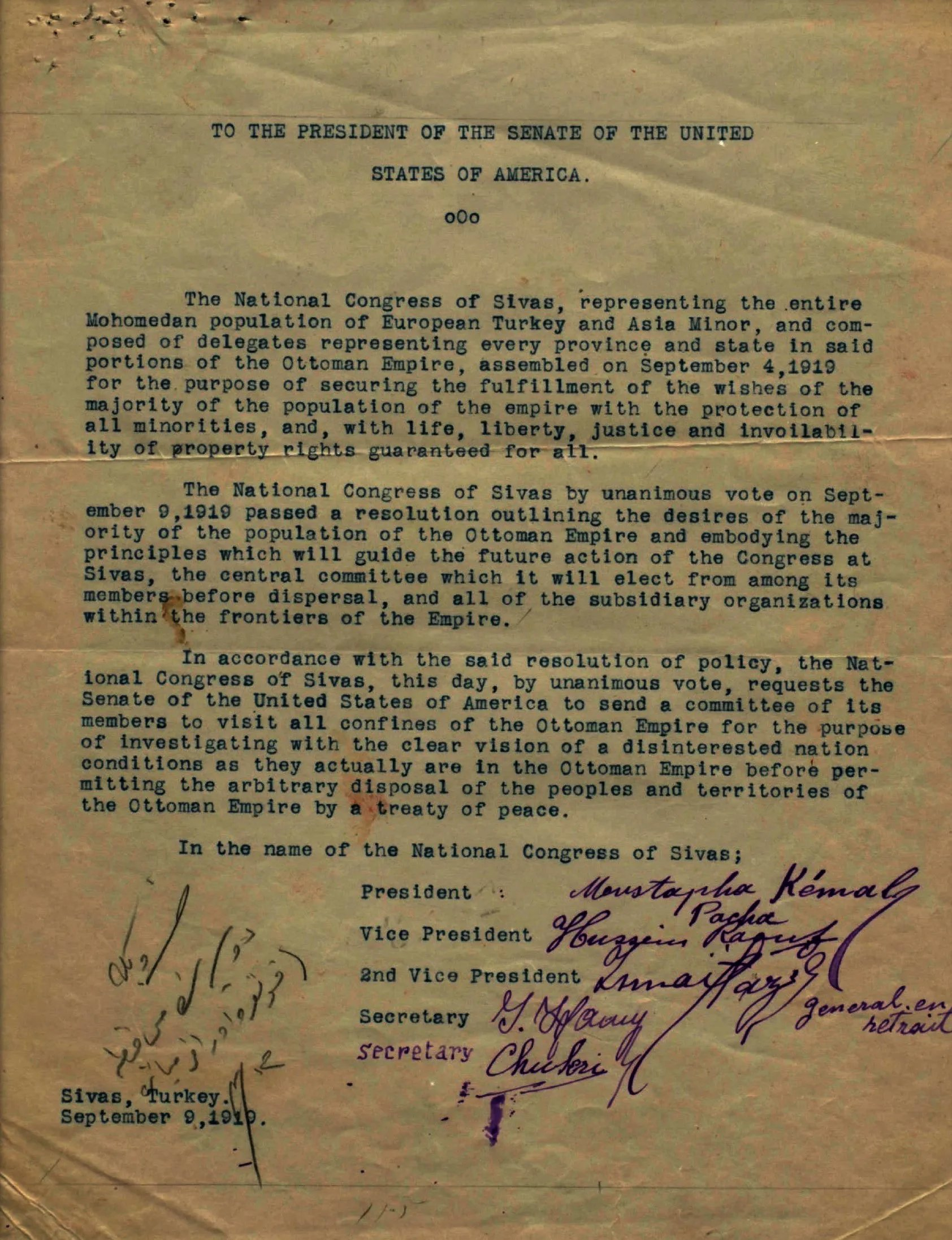
Letter sent from Sivas congress to Woodrow Wilson

=== Society of Wilson Principles ===
The association was founded in Istanbul on December 4 1918 by Ahmet Emin Yalman, and operated for two months. It aimed to find a solution, in line with Fourteen Points, to the question of sovereignty in Anatolia, which had been occupied by Allies after the end of World War I. Some members of the association proposed that the country should be placed under an American mandate after peace.

=== Sivas Congress ===
During the war many leaders like İsmet İnönü, Rauf Orbay, Hüseyin Cahit Yalçın etc. supported a US mandate for Turkey. In because of that they sent a letter directly to the US president Woodrow Wilson.

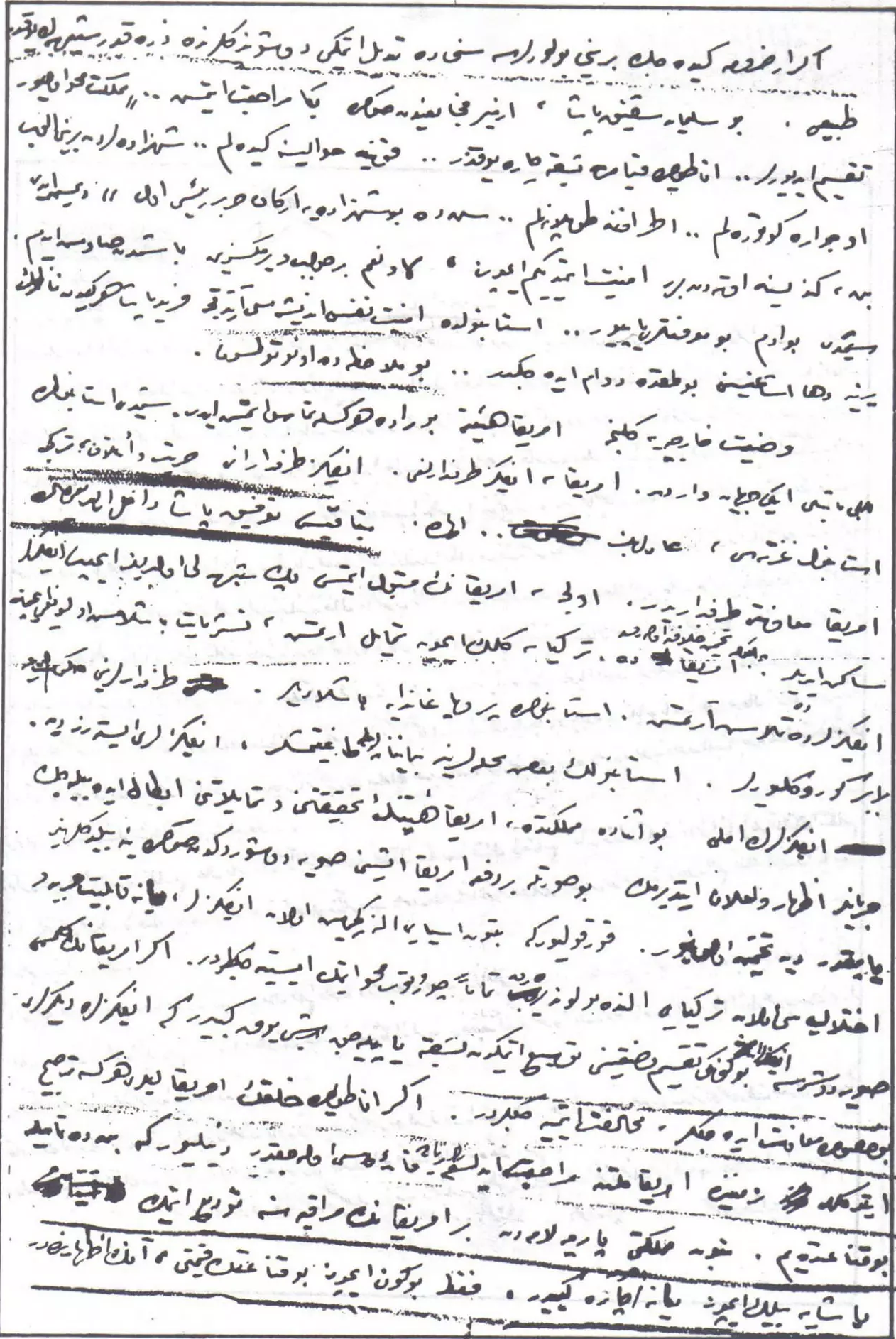
İsmet İnönü's letter to Kazım Karabekir regarding the US mandate

== Diplomatic missions ==
U.S. diplomatic missions in the empire included:

- Constantinople (Istanbul) – Legation/Embassy
  - It was located in Pera, now known as Beyoğlu.
- Aleppo
  - Consul: Jesse B. Jackson
- Beirut
- Brusa (Bursa)
- Harput/Kharpert (now in Elazığ)
  - Started from January 1, 1901 with Dr. Thomas H. Norton as the consul; he had no previous experience in international relations, as the U.S. was just recently establishing its diplomatic network. The consulate was established to assist missionaries. The Ottoman Ministry of Internal Security gave him a teskireh travel permit, but the Ottoman Ministry of Foreign Affairs initially refused to recognize the consulate. The building had three stories, a wall, and a garden with mulberry trees. Leslie A. Davis became consul of Harpoot in 1914; Davis stated that this mission was "one of the most remote and inaccessible in the world". Davis observed the Armenian genocide. Davis hid about 80 Armenians in the consulate grounds. His term ended with the cessation of Ottoman-U.S. relations in 1917.
- Jerusalem
- Mersina (Mersin)
- Samsun
- Smyrna (now İzmir)

Ottoman diplomatic missions to the U.S. included:

- Washington, DC (Embassy) – Classified as a "second class embassy".
- New York City (Consulate-General)
  - Established after the 1880s to monitor anti-Ottoman activity. New York City, previously served by an honorary consulate, had received increased immigration from the empire. Ottoman envoy Alexandros Mavrogenis had advocated for a full consulate-general and afterwards, on the grounds of New York having more diplomatic importance to the empire than Washington, DC, asked the Ottoman government for a vice consul in New York. The consuls in New York began to squabble for power with the Washington consuls. Kuneralp wrote that the conflict between New York City consul general Refet Bey and his respective Washington envoy, Yusuf Ziya Pasha, "took almost epical dimensions."
- Boston (Consulate-General)
  - Established in 1910 so the Ottomans could surveil Armenians in the U.S.

Honorary Ottoman consulates in the U.S.:

- Baltimore
  - William Grange served as honorary consul, selected by Blak.
- Boston (later replaced with a consulate-general)
  - Joseph Yazidiji, an Ottoman citizen, was an honorary consul.
- Chicago
- New Orleans
  - J. O. Nixon was honorary consul, selected by Blak.
- New York City (later replaced with a consulate-general)
- Philadelphia
- San Francisco
- Washington DC/Baltimore (later replaced with a legation/embassy)
  - George Porter became the honorary consul for Washington, DC and Baltimore in May 1858.

=== Ottoman ministers and ambassadors to the U.S. ===
- Edouard Blak Bey - 1867-
- Gregory Aristarchis Bey
- Hüseyin Tevfik Pasha
- Alexandros Mavrogenis Bey
- Mustafa Tahsin Bey – Died of tuberculosis shortly after he began his position
- Ali Ferruh Bey
- Mustafa Shekib Bey
- Mohammed Ali Bey al-Abed a.k.a. Mehmed Ali Bey
- Hüseyin Kazım Bey - Appointed as the first ambassador
- Yusuf Ziya Pasha
- Ahmet Rüstem Bey a.k.a. Alfred de Bilinsky – The final Ottoman Ambassador to the U.S.

The Ottoman government chose to continue the mission with a charge, Hüseyin Avni Bey, after World War I began, and this appointment ended with the cutoff of diplomatic relations on April 20, 1917.

Kuneralp stated that these officials were "interesting figures" but that there was not "a Wellington Koo" among them and "they did not shine in their diplomatic careers", as the Ottoman government did not view this post to be important. He also stated that Madame Bey, wife of first secretary Sıtkı Bey, due to her participation in American social life, was actually the most well-known person in the Ottoman diplomatic community within the US.

=== American ministers and ambassadors to the Ottoman Empire ===
Chargé d'Affaires:

- George W. Erving (pre-1831)
- David Porter (September 13, 1831 – May 23, 1840)

Minister Resident:

- David Porter (May 23, 1840 – March 3, 1843)
- Dabney Smith Carr (February 29, 1844 – October 20, 1849)
- George Perkins Marsh (March 11, 1850 – December 19, 1853)
- Carroll Spence (February 9, 1854 – December 12, 1857)
- James Williams (May 27, 1858 – May 25, 1861)
- Edward Joy Morris (October 22, 1861 – October 25, 1870)
- Wayne MacVeagh (October 25, 1870 – June 10, 1871)
- George H. Boker (March 25, 1872 – May 1, 1875)
- Horace Maynard (June 12, 1875 – July 15, 1880)
- James Longstreet (December 14, 1880 – April 29, 1881)
- Lewis Wallace (September 6, 1881 – September 4, 1882)

Envoy Extraordinary and Minister Plenipotentiary:

- Lewis Wallace (September 4, 1882 – May 15, 1885)
- Samuel S. Cox (August 25, 1885 – September 14, 1886)
- Oscar S. Straus (July 1, 1887 – June 16, 1889)
- Solomon Hirsch (December 28, 1889 – June 16, 1892)
- David P. Thompson (January 11, 1893 – May 1, 1893)
- Alexander W. Terrell (July 7, 1893 – June 15, 1897)
- James Burrill Angell (September 3, 1897 – August 13, 1898)
- Oscar S. Straus (October 15, 1898 – December 20, 1899)
- John G. A. Leishman (March 29, 1901 – October 5, 1906)

Ambassador Extraordinary and Plenipotentiary:

- John G. A. Leishman (October 5, 1906 – June 10, 1909)
- Oscar S. Straus (October 4, 1909 – September 3, 1910)
- William Woodville Rockhill (August 28, 1911 – November 20, 1913)
- Henry Morgenthau, Sr. (December 11, 1913 – February 1, 1916)
- Abram I. Elkus (October 2, 1916 – April 20, 1917)

High Commissioner for Turkey:

- Mark Lambert Bristol (January 28, 1919 - end of empire)

== See also ==
- Foreign relations of the Ottoman Empire
- Foreign relations of the United States

Books about the relations:

- America and the Armenian Genocide of 1915

Relations between the United States and countries once a part of the empire.

- Albania–United States relations
- Bulgaria–United States relations
- Egypt–United States relations
- Greece–United States relations
- Iraq–United States relations
- Israel–United States relations
- Jordan–United States relations
- Lebanon–United States relations
- Libya–United States relations
- North Macedonia–United States relations
- Palestine–United States relations
- Saudi Arabia–United States relations (for the Hejaz region)
- Syria–United States relations
- Turkey–United States relations
- Yemen–United States relations
