= Blacque =

Blacque is a surname. Notable people with the surname include:

- Edouard Blacque (1824–1895), French-Ottoman journalist
- Taurean Blacque (1940–2022), American actor

== See also ==
- Blacque Jacque Shellacque, fictional minor character in the Looney Tunes franchise
- Black (disambiguation)
