= Alexandros Mavrogenis =

Prince of Samos (1902–1904)

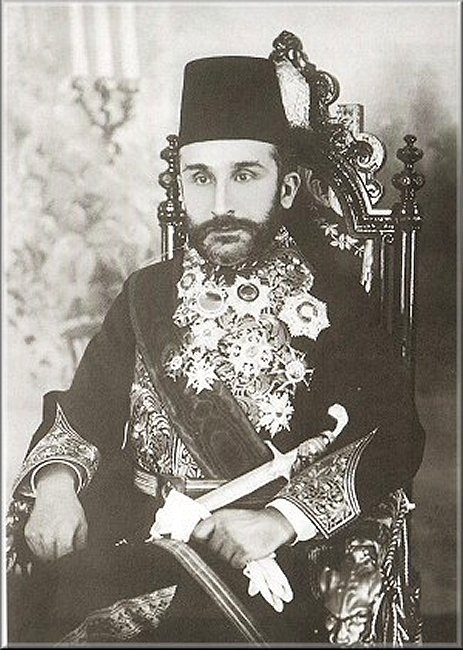

Prince of Samos
- In office 1902–1904
- Preceded by: Michail Grigoriadis
- Succeeded by: Ioannis Vithynos

Ottoman envoy to the United States
- In office 1887–1896
- Preceded by: Rüstem Effendi
- Succeeded by: Mustafa Tahsin Bey

Personal details
- Born: 1845
- Died: 1929 (aged 83–84)

Alexandros Mavrogenis Bey was the Ottoman-appointed Prince of Samos from 1902 to 1904.

A member of the Mavrogheni family, his father, Spyridon Mavrogenis Pasha, was the personal physician of the Ottoman Sultan Abdul Hamid II.

A Phanariot, he was a secretary to the Sultan of the Ottoman Empire and the Ottoman minister to the United States, before he was appointed governor of Samos, in March 1902. Sinan Kuneralp, author of "Ottoman Diplomatic and Consular Personnel in the United States of America, 1867-1917," described him as "well-connected".

While minister to the U.S. he examined activities of Armenian political operatives. Kuneralp wrote that Alexandros Mavrogenis was "diligent" in this task. He had the nickname "Prince of Envoys" as he spent a lot of funds on recreational activities.

When relations between Spyridon and Abdul Hamid declined, Alexandros lost his ambassadorial position. Armenians in the United States had a favorable reception to his departure. On being appointed to the office of Prince of Samos, he was well-intentioned and wanted to work for the progress and good of Samos but fell short of these noble intentions.

However, he was an extremely nervous and timid man and because of the situation with the quarreling political factions on the island, which left no room for wise administration. He ruled strictly, but after elections to the Samian Parliament, the party he supported lost and he was dismissed.

He founded the Mavrogenios Professional School of Malagari and also ordered built the marble fountain of the monastery of Zoodohos Pigi.

== See also ==
- Ottoman Empire-United States relations
