= Gregory Aristarchis =

Greek Ottoman diplomat (1843–1914)

Gregory "Ligor" Aristarchis (Greek: Γρηγόριος Αριστάρχης; French: Grégoire Aristarchi; 1843–1914), also known as Aristarchi Bey, was an Ottoman diplomat of Phanariote Greek ethnicity, compiler of a corpus of Ottoman legislation.

== Education and career ==
Originally a provincial jurist, he became the director of foreign correspondence of Crete beginning in 1861, and then from 1867 the Smyrna (today known as İzmir) directeur politique ("political director") and vice-governor.

He served as Ottoman Minister in Washington from 1873 to 1883 with Alexandros Mavrogenis. The Ottoman government dismissed him from his post. Sinan Kuneralp, author of "Ottoman Diplomatic and Consular Personnel in the United States of America, 1867-1917," argued that his relationship with Midhat Pasha was the "more likely" reason why he was fired, while the official accusation was that Aristarchis misused money from a weapons deal. After 1883 he lived in Paris where he worked as advisor to Alfred Nobel. After the fall of Abdul Hamid II he served as an Ottoman envoy to the Netherlands, where he died.

== Works ==
He compiled Législation ottomane, ou Recueil des lois, règlements, ordonnances, traités, capitulations et autres documents officiels de l´Empire ottoman, one of the first collections of the Ottoman Law in 7 volumes in French language, while Demetrius Nicolaides edited them. Aristarchis is named in most volumes, except for 6–7, which, according to Strauss, "seem to have been edited solely by Demetrius Nicolaides". The collection was intended for foreigners living in the empire, including employees of foreign ministries. Strauss described it as the "best-known example of" a collection of Ottoman laws.

== Personal life ==
Strauss wrote that Aristarchis was a "popular figure" in the United States, and Kuneralp wrote that in his youth he "was a dashing young bachelor known for his many feminine conquests." He appeared as the main character in a novel by Henry James.

== See also ==
- Ottoman Empire-United States relations

== Works ==
- Aristarchi Gregoire bey (1873, 1874, 1878, 1881) Legislation ottomane, ou Recueil des lois, reglements, ordonnances, traités, capitulations et autres documents officiels de l'Émpire Ottoman. Constantinople: Imprimerie, Frères Nicolaides (in French)
  - National Library of France (BnF) Gallica: volumes 1, 2, 3, 4, 5, 6, and 7
  - Also at University of Crete
  - Also at HeinOnline
