= America and the Armenian Genocide of 1915 =

2003 book by Jay Winter

- Author: Jay Winter
- Language: English
- Genre: Non-fiction
- Publisher: Cambridge University Press
- Publication date: 2003

America and the Armenian Genocide of 1915 is a 2003 non-fiction book written and edited by Jay Winter and published by Cambridge University Press.

== See also ==
- Ottoman Empire-United States relations
