= Jay Winter =

American historian (born 1945)

Jay Murray Winter
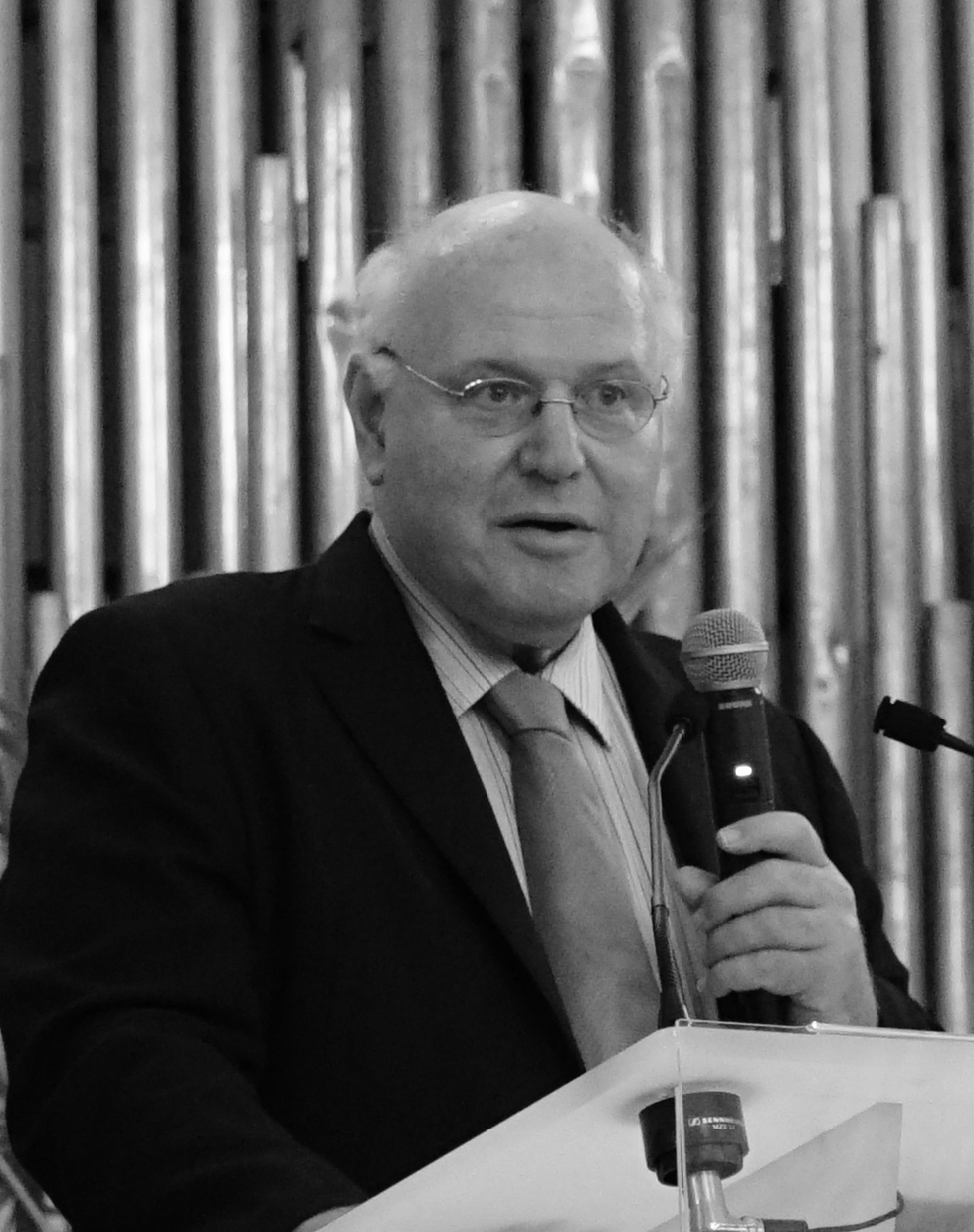
- Jay Winter in Reims, France, (2017)
- Born: May 28, 1945 (age 81)
- Occupation: Historian

Academic background
- Education: A.B. at Columbia University; Ph.D. at University of Cambridge

Jay Murray Winter (born May 28, 1945) is an American historian and author. He is the Charles J. Stille Professor of History at Yale University.

Winter is also affiliated with the Museum of the Great War in Peronne, France, a research center and museum of World War I in European cultural history.

== Education and career ==
He obtained his A.B. degree at Columbia University and his Ph.D. at the University of Cambridge.

Winter taught at the Hebrew University of Jerusalem, the University of Warwick, the University of Cambridge, Columbia University, and Australian National University. In 2001, he joined the Yale History faculty. He retired in 2015 as emeritus professor.

He has served on the French President’s Commission on the Centenary of the Great War. Professor Winter has received honorary degrees from the University of Graz, the Katholic University of Leuven and the University of Paris. In 2016, he received the Victor Adler Prize of the Austrian state for a lifetime's work in history.

== Research ==
Winter focuses his research on World War I and its impact on the 20th century. His other interests include remembrance of war in the 20th century, such as memorial and mourning sites, European population decline, the causes and institutions of war, British popular culture in the era of the First World War, and the Armenian genocide of 1915.

Winter's earlier work largely focused on social history, including The Great War and the British People (1986) focuses on the war's demographic impact on the British population. In more recent works, he has taken the approach of a cultural historian, most notably in Sites of Memory, Sites of Mourning (1995), where he advocates a more transnational focus for studying the war and European culture. In this book, he analyzes the various ways the people of Germany, France and Great Britain mourned their losses during and after the war.

Winter was co-producer, co-writer and chief historian for the PBS series The Great War and the Shaping of the 20th Century, which won an Emmy Award, a Peabody Award and a Producers Guild of America Award for best television documentary in 1997.

At Yale, Winter teaches a lecture course entitled "Europe in the Age of Total War, 1914–1945", in which he argues that World War I, World War II, and the inter-war period, are better understood as one "European Civil War". He also teaches a seminar entitled "The First World War".

Winter also worked with American demographer Michael S. Teitelbaum on high levels of migration toward countries experiencing fairly low fertility rates (The Fear of Population Decline, 1986 and A Question of Numbers, 1998).

== Works ==
- Socialism and the Challenge of War: Ideas and Politics in Britain, 1912-18 (Routledge, 1974)
- The Fear of Population Decline (with Michael S. Teitelbaum) (Academic Press, 1986)
- The Great War and the British People (Harvard University Press, 1986)
- The Experience of World War I (Macmillan, 1988)
- Sites of Memory, Sites of Mourning: The Great War in European Cultural History (Cambridge University Press, 1995)
- 1914-1918: The Great War and the Shaping of the 20th Century (1996)
- A Question of Numbers (with Michael S. Teitelbaum) (1998)
- Capital Cities at War: Paris, London, Berlin 1914-1919 (2 vol. Cambridge University Press, 1999, 2000) edited with Jean-Louis Robert.
- War and Remembrance in the Twentieth Century (Cambridge University Press, 1999, editor)
- America and the Armenian Genocide of 1915 (Cambridge University Press, 2003, editor)
- Editor with Antoine Prost, The Great War in history: debates and controversies, 1914 to the present (Cambridge University Press, 2005).
- Remembering War: The Great War between History and Memory in the 20th Century (Yale University Press, 2006)
- Dreams of Peace and Freedom: Utopian Moments in the 20th Century (Yale University Press, 2008)
- René Cassin and Human Rights: From the Great War to the Universal Declaration (with Antoine Prost) (Cambridge University Press, 2013)
- Editor, The Cambridge History of the First World War: Volume 1, Global War (Cambridge University Press, 2016)
- War Beyond Words: Languages of Remembrance from the Great War to the Present (Cambridge University Press, 2017)
- The Day the Great War Ended, 24 July 1923: The Civilianization of War (Oxford University Press, 2022)

== Sources ==
- Black, Monica. 'Review of Remembering War: The Great War Between Historical Memory and History in the Twentieth Century by Jay Winter", The Hedghog Review -- Critical Reflections on Contemporary Culture 9.2 (Summer 2007). online
- Oliver, Lizzie. "Jay Winter, War Beyond Words: Languages of Remembrance from the Great War to the Present." Journal of Contemporary History 55.2 (2020): 443-445.
- Winter, Jay. "Learning the Historian’s Craft" (H-Diplo 13 November 2020) online autobiography
