= Edouard Blak =

French-Ottoman journalist (1824–1895)

Edouard Blak Bey
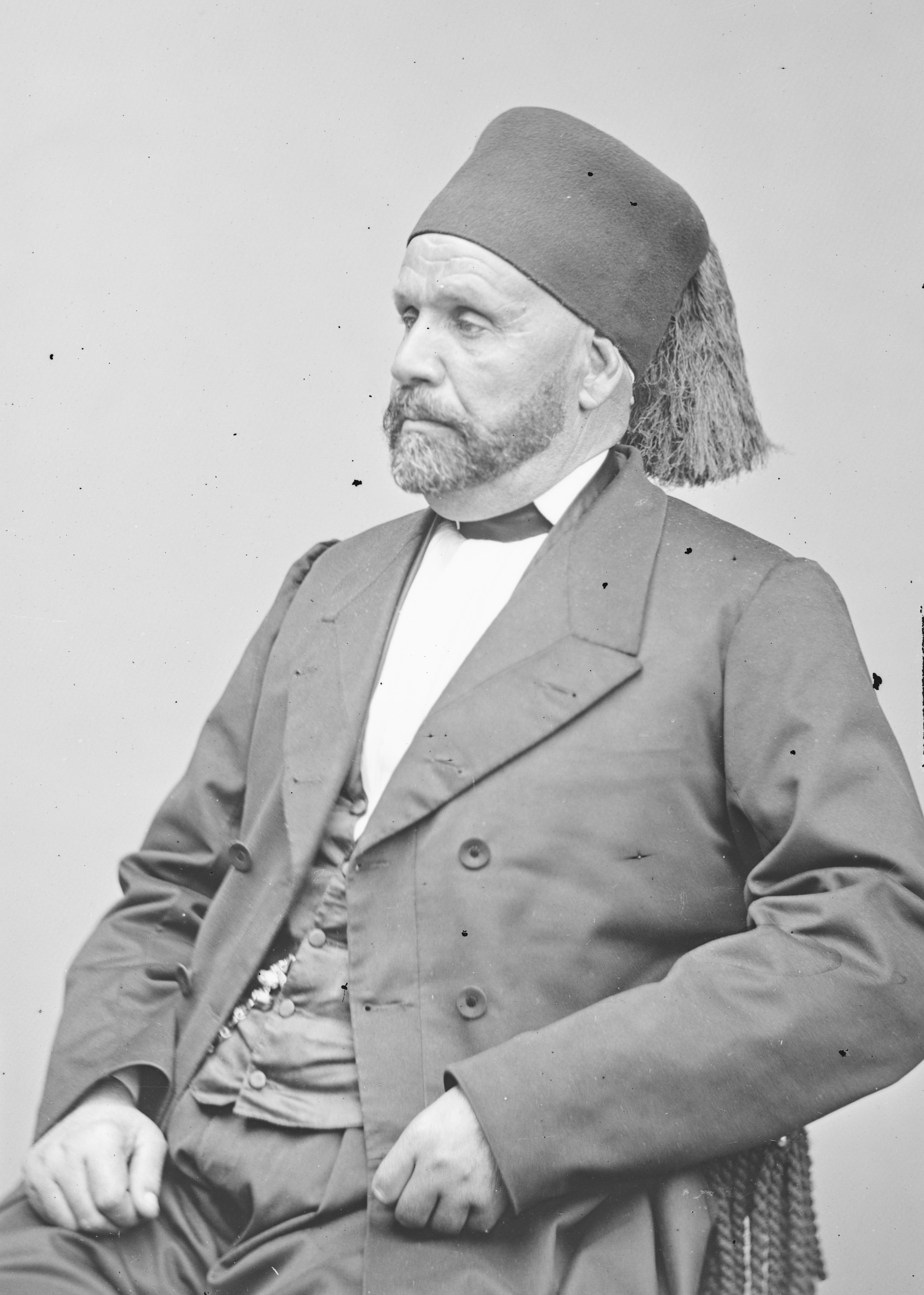
- Portrait of Blak by Mathew Brady
- Born: 1824
- Died: 1895 (aged 70–71)

1st Ottoman minister to the United States
- In office 1867–1873
- Succeeded by: Gregory Aristarchis

Edouard Blak Bey a.k.a. Edouard Blacque (1824–1895) was the first minister of the Ottoman Empire to the United States.

His father, a Frenchman descended from the Scottish Catholic Black family, was Alexandre Blacque, editor of Le Moniteur ottoman. The Ottoman state sent Blak on scholarship to Collège Saint-Barbe in France in 1837, making him the first non-Muslim to get such a scholarship. Blak married an American woman whose father was a well-known surgeon.

Blak joined the Ottoman Foreign service with posts in Paris, France and Naples, Italy. In the mid-1850s Blak, sensing the rise of the United States, asked the Ottoman government to establish a diplomatic post in the U.S.; at the time the U.S. already had a minister to the empire. Blak's motive for the request stemmed from his marriage. The empire did not reciprocate until 1867.

Blak came to the U.S. in 1866, and was accompanied by his new wife, a Levantine Catholic woman, as his American wife had died by then. While in the United States she gave birth to a son, named Reşad or Richard. Blak stated that he had a positive view of the United States of America from his term of service.

Blak appeared in a photograph with Robert E. Lee, philanthropists, and other former officials of the Confederate Army and government. Sinan Kuneralp, author of "Ottoman Diplomatic and Consular Personnel in the United States of America, 1867-1917," described this photograph as "one of America's most valuable pictorial documents" and what Blak "is best remembered [for] today".

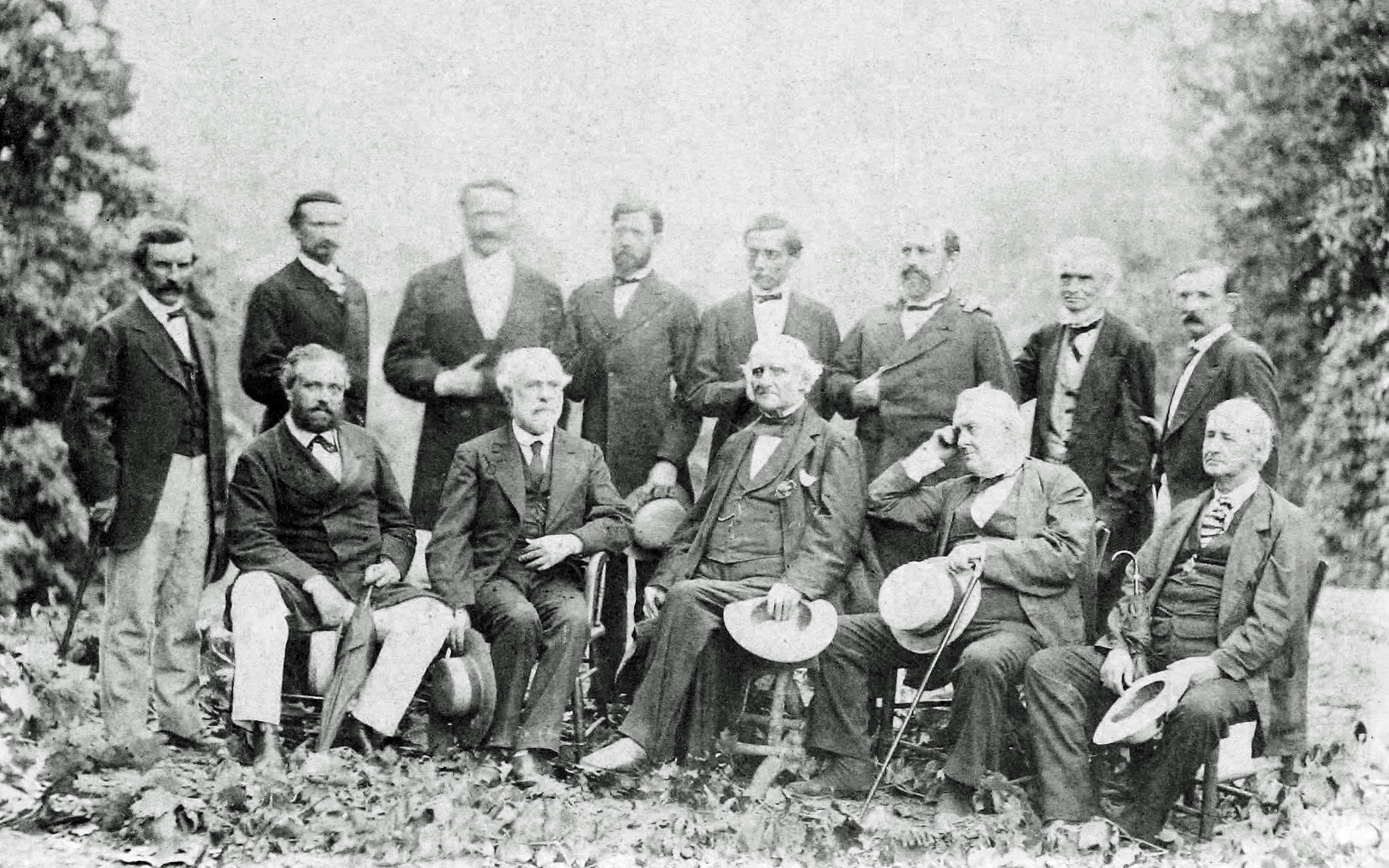
Robert E Lee with his Generals and Blacque Bey, seated at far left, 1869

His term as U.S. envoy ended in 1873. He became president of Pera Municipality (now Beyoğlu), where he established a system of public parks that got inspiration from Washington, DC.

== See also ==
- Ottoman Empire-United States relations
