= Jesse B. Jackson =

American diplomat, witness to Armenian genocide (1871-1947)

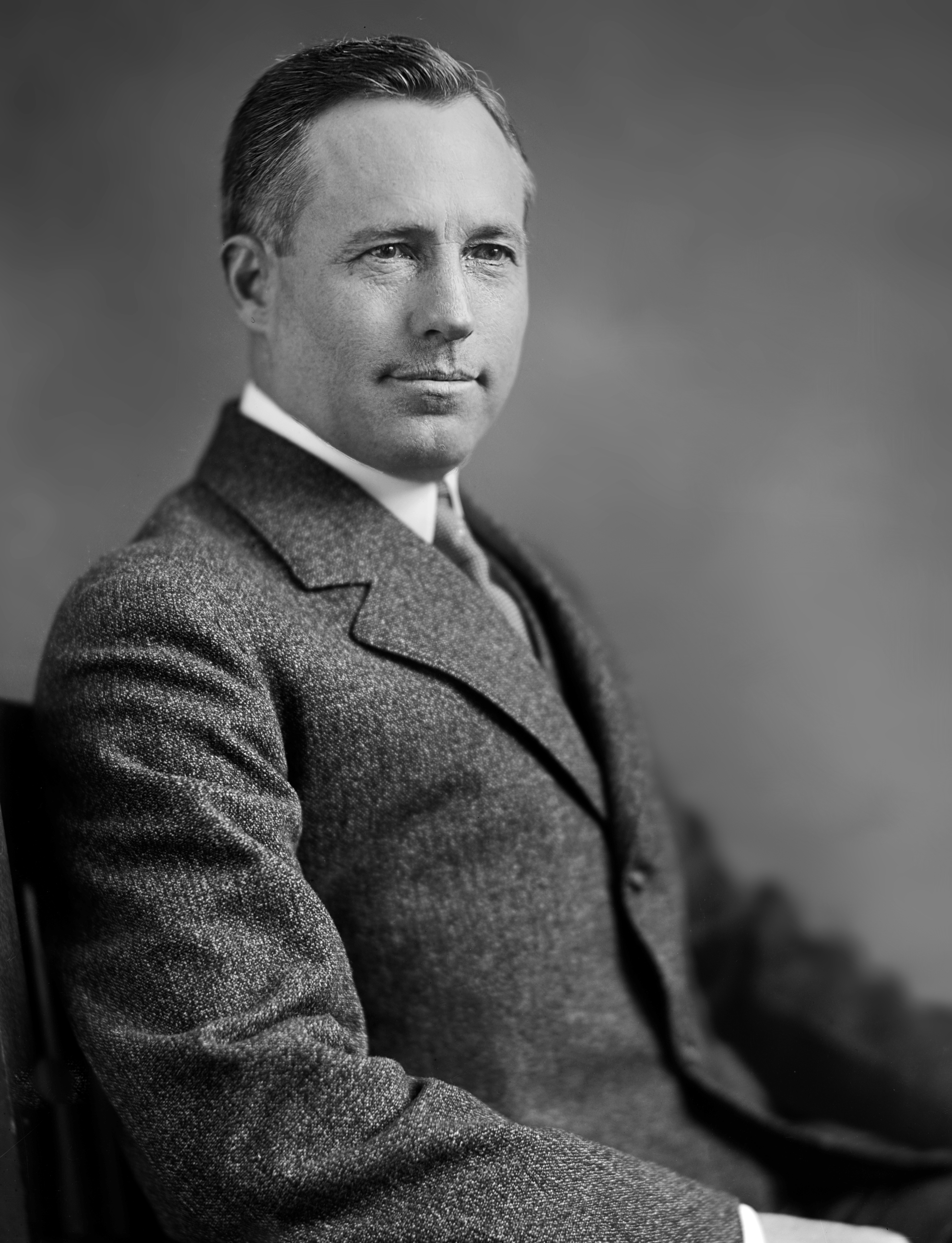
- Born: November 19, 1871; Paulding, Ohio
- Died: December 4, 1947 (aged 76); Columbus, Ohio
- Occupation: United States Consul
- Known for: Witness to the Armenian genocide

Jesse Benjamin Jackson (November 19, 1871 – December 4, 1947) was a United States consul and an important eyewitness to the Armenian genocide. He served as consul in Aleppo when the city was the junction of many important deportation routes. Jackson concluded that the policies towards the Armenians were "without doubt a carefully planned scheme to thoroughly extinguish the Armenian race." He considered the "wartime anti-Armenian measures" to be a "gigantic plundering scheme as well as a final blow to extinguish the race." By September 15, 1915, Jackson estimated that a million Armenians had been killed and deemed his own survival a "miracle". After the Armenian Genocide, Jackson led a relief effort and was credited with saving the lives of "thousands of Armenians."

After serving as consul in Aleppo, Jackson served in Italy and Canada. He was awarded numerous medals, including the Order of Merit of Lebanon. He died on December 4, 1947, at the age of 76.

== Early life ==
Jesse Benjamin Jackson was born in Paulding, Ohio, on November 19, 1871, to Andrew Carl Jackson and Lucy Ann (Brown) Jackson. Jackson attended the local Paulding public schools and eventually served as a quartermaster sergeant in the U.S. Army during the Spanish–American War. Jackson enrolled as a clerk of the House of Representatives from 1900 to 1901 and later was employed in the insurance and real estate business. Jackson was later appointed as the American consul at Alexandretta (İskenderun) on March 15, 1905. This position lasted until 1908 when he became the U.S. consul at Aleppo.

== Armenian genocide ==
As early as November 19, 1912, after four years as consul in Aleppo, Jackson had his staff raise concerns with the foreign embassies in Constantinople that the Turkish government was determined to place the Vilayet of Aleppo under martial law, warning that Muslims, who had abandoned their duties from the army, were engaged in "depredations" in the province, which the Turkish authorities accused the Armenians of carrying out, so that the latter "shall be at the mercy of the Moslems." Jackson requested that the embassies raise the issue with the Ottoman government, so as to prevent massacres against the Armenians "which, under the present strained conditions, would spread like wildfire, and likely engulf Christians of all denominations far and wide."

In April 1915, some months after the outbreak of World War I, a copy of a thirty-page "seditious" pamphlet was sent by Jackson to Henry Morgenthau, the U.S. ambassador in Constantinople. Published and printed in Arabic by the National Society of Defense for the Seat of the Caliphate and entitled "A Universal Proclamation to All the People of Islam", the pamphlet was distributed by the Germans and encouraged every Muslim to free the believers "in the Unity of God" from "the grasp of the infidels." It also encouraged Muslims to boycott Armenian businesses:

Jesse Jackson in his youth

The Muslims labored and toiled wearily and bore hardness of life that they might gain something with which to satisfy their needs, and the oppressive conquerors of the Christians subdued them and robbed them of that which was in their hands of the means of living. And they spend this booty in the West upon churches and upon the priests and places of shame and iniquity, in short, the Muslims work and the infidels eat, the Muslims are hungry and suffer, and the infidels are satiated and live in luxury. The Islamic world sinks down and goes backward, and the Christian world progresses and is exalted; and the sum of it all is, that the Muslim is enslaved and the infidel is the grand ruler ... And now, O people of Islam, and O beloved brothers ... rise up, awake, this weakness and this subjection has reached its limit, and this humiliation and this belittling has arrived at its end.

By spreading the pamphlet, Jackson believed that the Germans were trying to incite massacre. He added: "Surely something should be done to prevent the continuation of such propagandas in the future, or one day the result sought will be obtained, and it will be disastrous."

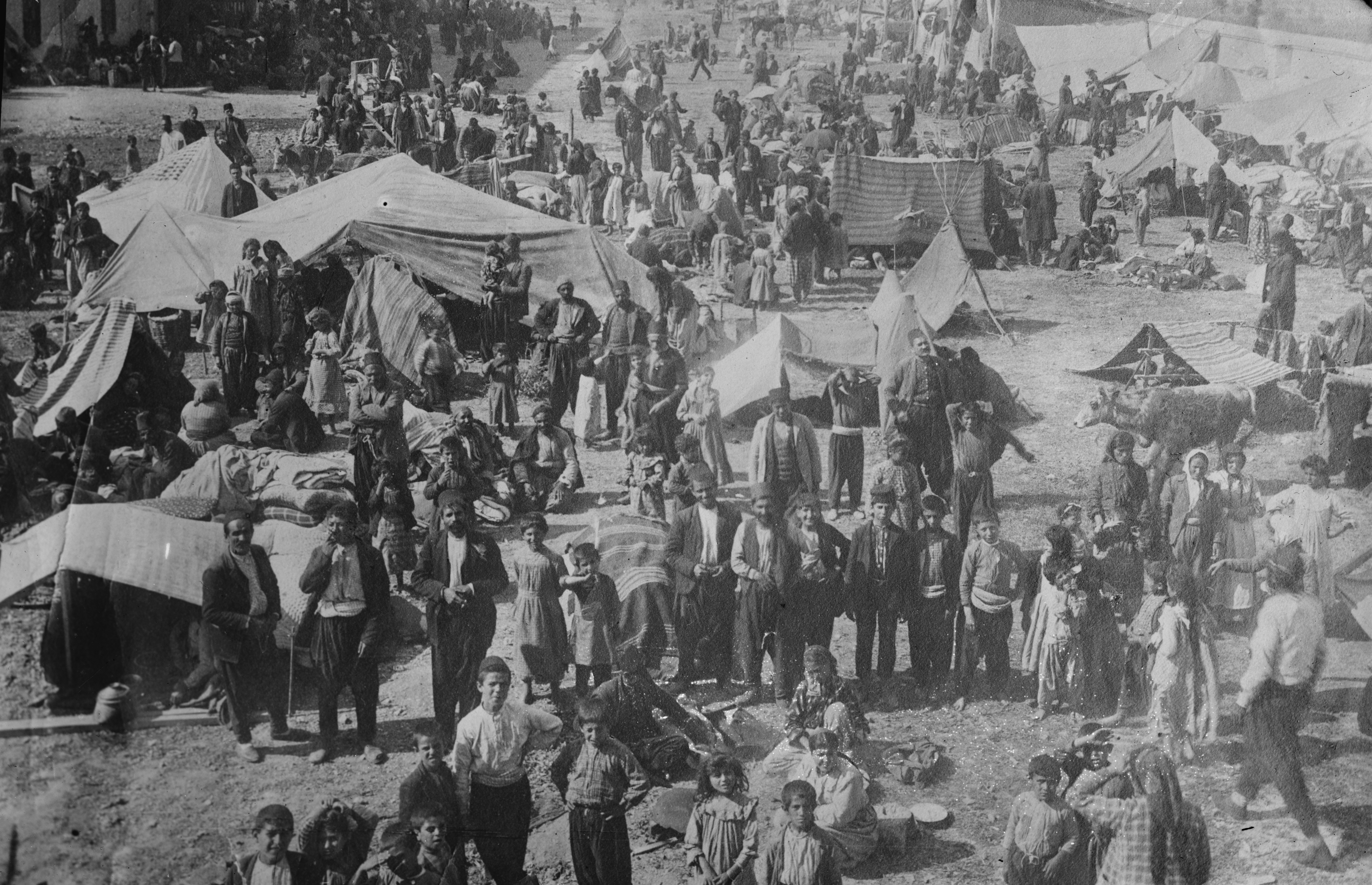
Jackson reported that thousands had been sent to Aleppo and thence to Deir ez-Zor. "The misery these people are suffering is terrible to imagine," Jackson wrote. "The Armenians themselves say that they would by far have preferred a massacre, which would have been less disastrous to them."

On April 20, 1915, Jackson relayed to Morgenthau, to the secretary of state, and to the American Board of Commissioners for Foreign Missions, a report prepared by the Reverend John E. Merrill, president of Central Turkey College at Aintab, on the situation in the region stretching from Aintab to Marash and Zeitun. The nine-page document described the similarities between the contemporary situation in the Marash region and that during the previous Hamidian massacre and the Adana massacre of 1909. As during the massacres of 1895–96, it noted, the Turkish government was spreading false rumors that the Armenians in the Marash region were threatening law and order. Jackson claimed that the local officials deceived the Armenians in Zeitun and in nearby Furnus into surrendering their arms in hopes of averting punishment, as during the Adana massacres of 1909, while causing the death of innocent women and children. He further asserted that the conscription of young male Armenians into the Turkish army was followed by imprisonment, deportations, and massacres. Merrill believed that the deportation of the Marash region was "a direct blow at American missionary interests, menacing the results of more than fifty years of work and many thousands of dollars of expenditure."

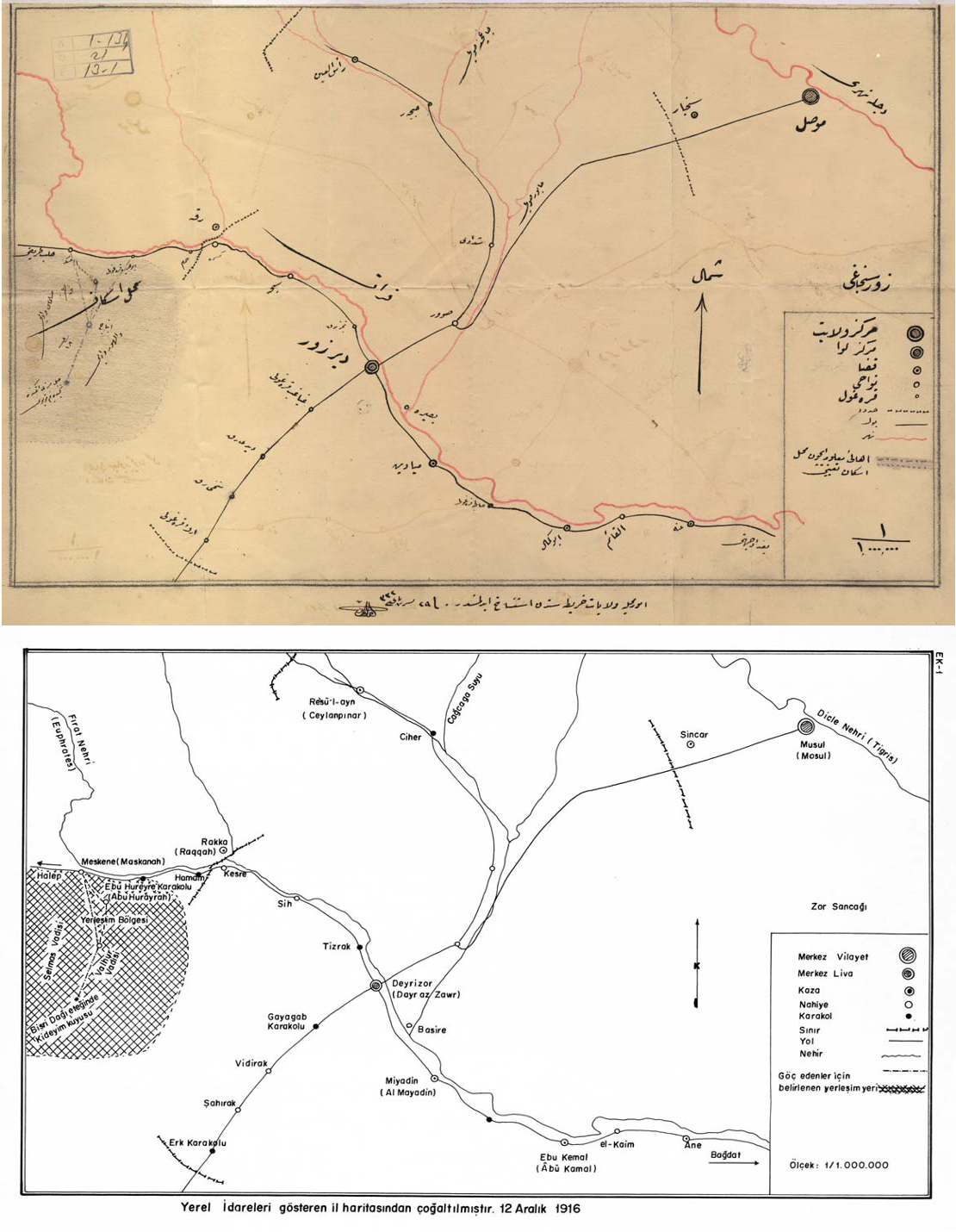
Map of Armenian refugee camps in and around the Deir ez-Zor province. Jackson estimated that around 350,000 refugees had converged at Deir el-Zor, and more than 500,000 Armenians had been killed in the area months after the Armenian Genocide started. He reported that "the sides of the roads are strewn with the bones or decaying bodies" of the deportees in and around the province.

By June 5, 1915, Jackson wrote to ambassador Morgenthau that the Ottoman government policy towards Armenians "is without doubt a carefully planned scheme to thoroughly extinguish the Armenian race." In the same report, he wrote that a large influx of Armenians were pouring into Aleppo from Marash, Zeitun, Adana, Hajin, and other localities. Each group consisted of 300–500 old men, women, and children, as the young and the middle-aged had been ordered into military service. He added that thousands were being "scattered over the desert to starve or die of disease in burning heat". Jackson estimated that more than 25,000 Armenian refugees were in northern Syria and that "in the interior a perfect reign of terror exists."

As early as August 15, 1915, Jackson estimated that approximately 350,000 refugees had converged at Deir el-Zor, and more than 500,000 Armenians had been killed. He further reported that practically all the Armenians from the provinces of "Van, Erzeroum, Bitlis, Diarbekir, Mamouret ul-Aziz, Angora and Sivas have already been practically exterminated, and even conservative estimates already place the death toll well over 500,000." In regards to looting and robbery, Jackson wrote that a "systematic search was made of each person before the murders and whatever money or article of value they possessed was taken from them by order of the governor who personally took charge of the loot. The actual murderers were permitted to profit by whatever clothing or other things found on the corpses, and many articles of clothing were recognized in Deir-el-Zor thereafter in the possession of these brigands and others to whom they were sold." In a telegram dispatched on May 12, Jackson stated that "according to reports from reliable sources the accompanying gendarmes are told that they may do as they wish with the women and girls."

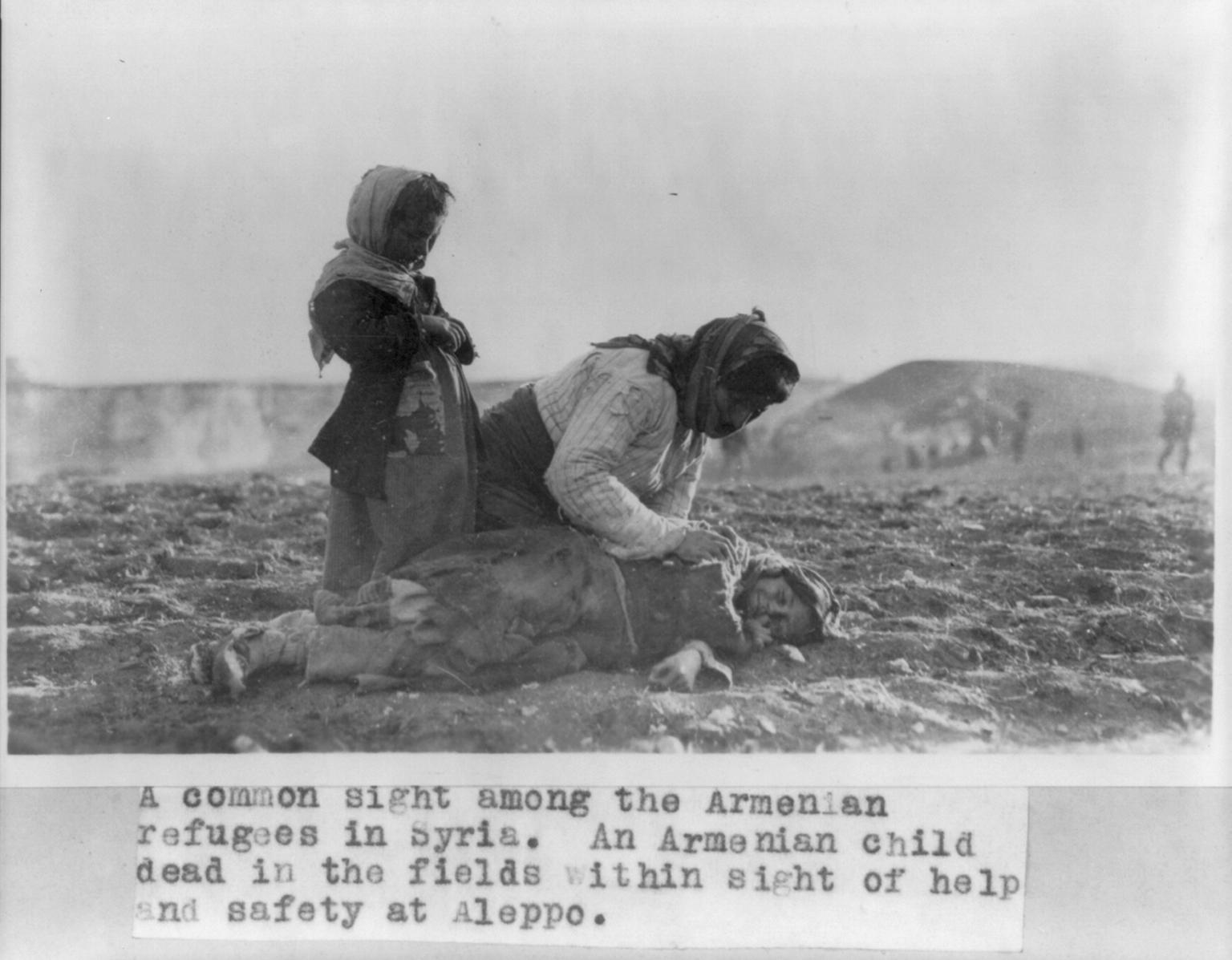
Armenian woman kneeling beside dead child in field "within sight of help and safety at Aleppo". Jackson reported that thousands of men, women, and children were being "scattered over the desert to starve or die of disease in burning heat".

In a letter sent to Morgenthau on August 19, Jackson stated that the deportations were of all Armenians regardless of their religious affiliation (i.e., Catholicism or Protestantism). He noted that nine trains passed through Aleppo between 1 and 19 August, several of which were carrying thousands of Armenians from Ainteb who were subsequently robbed by villagers. Jackson described these "wartime anti-Armenian measures" as a "gigantic plundering scheme as well as a final blow to extinguish the race."

Jackson reported the statistics in detail of Meskene, a deportation zone, in a 10 September 1916 dispatch: "Information obtained on the spot permits me to state that nearly 60,000 Armenians are buried there, carried off by hunger, privations of all sorts, intestinal diseases and the typhus that results. As far as the eye can reach, mounds can be seen containing 200 to 300 corpses buried pell-mell, women children and old people belonging to different families."

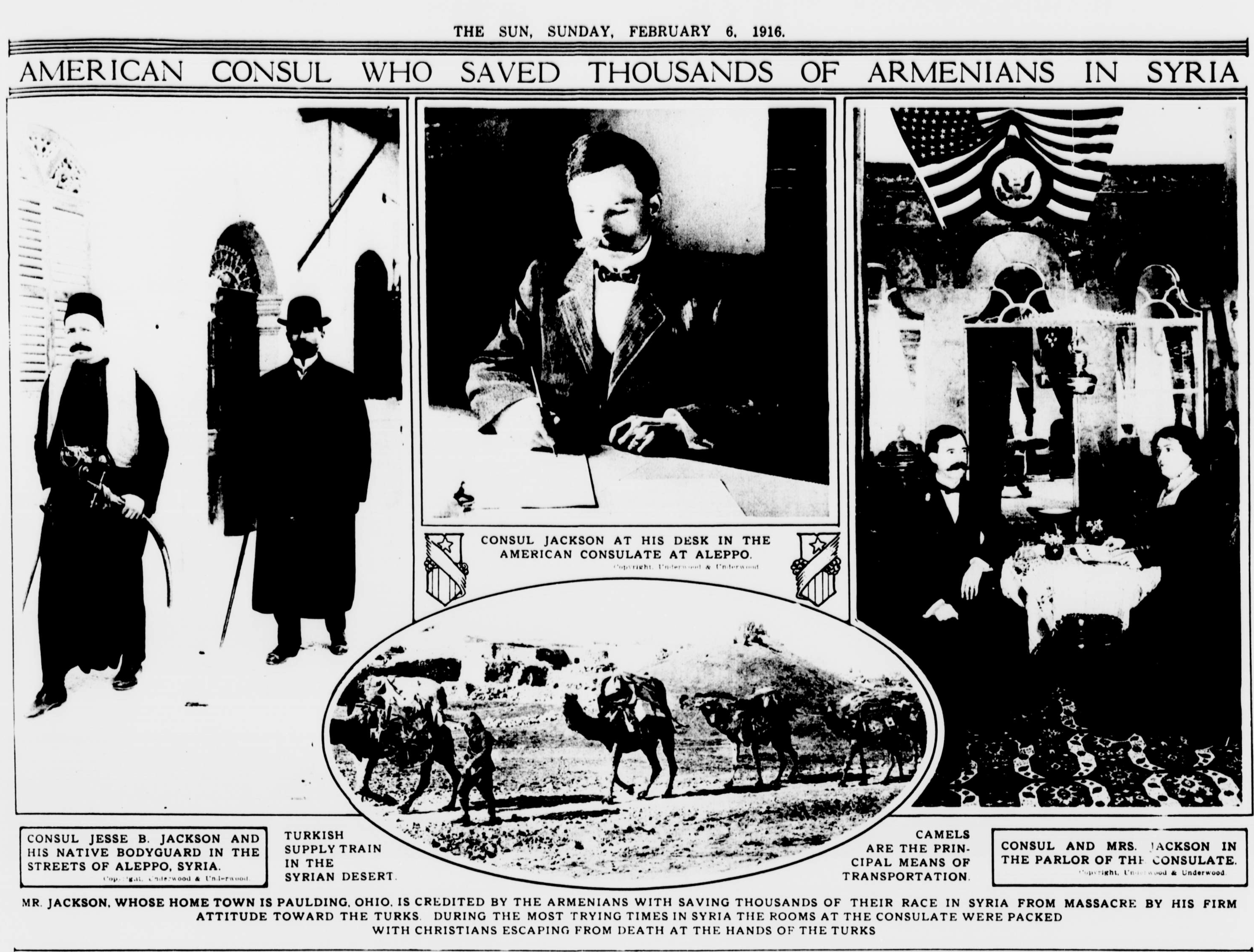
Jackson led a campaign to save the lives of Armenians and support the relief effort. According to an article published by The Sun on February 9, 1916, he is credited for saving the lives of "thousands of Armenians".

On September 29, in a letter to Morgenthau, Jackson placed the survival rate of the deportees at about 15 percent and further noted that this had amounted to the deaths of about a million Armenians. He wrote:

One of the most terrible sights ever seen in Aleppo was the arrival early in August, 1915, of some 5,000 terribly emaciated, dirty, ragged and sick women and children, 3,000 in one day and 2,000 the following day. These people were the only survivors of the thrifty and well to do Armenian population of the province of Sivas, where the Armenian population had once been over 300,000.

He described the deplorable condition of the deportees; all were "sparsely clad and some naked from the treatment by their escorts and the despoiling depopulation en route. It is extremely rare to find a family intact that has come any considerable distance, invariably all having lost members from disease and fatigue, young girls and boys carried off by hostile tribesmen," and the men separated from their families and killed. "The exhausted condition of the victims is further proven by the death of a hundred or more daily of those arriving in the city." The situation was also reaffirmed by Consul Rössler who reported on September 27 that Djemal Pasha had issued an order prohibiting the taking of photographs and that taking pictures of the Armenians was considered to be unauthorized photography of military operations.

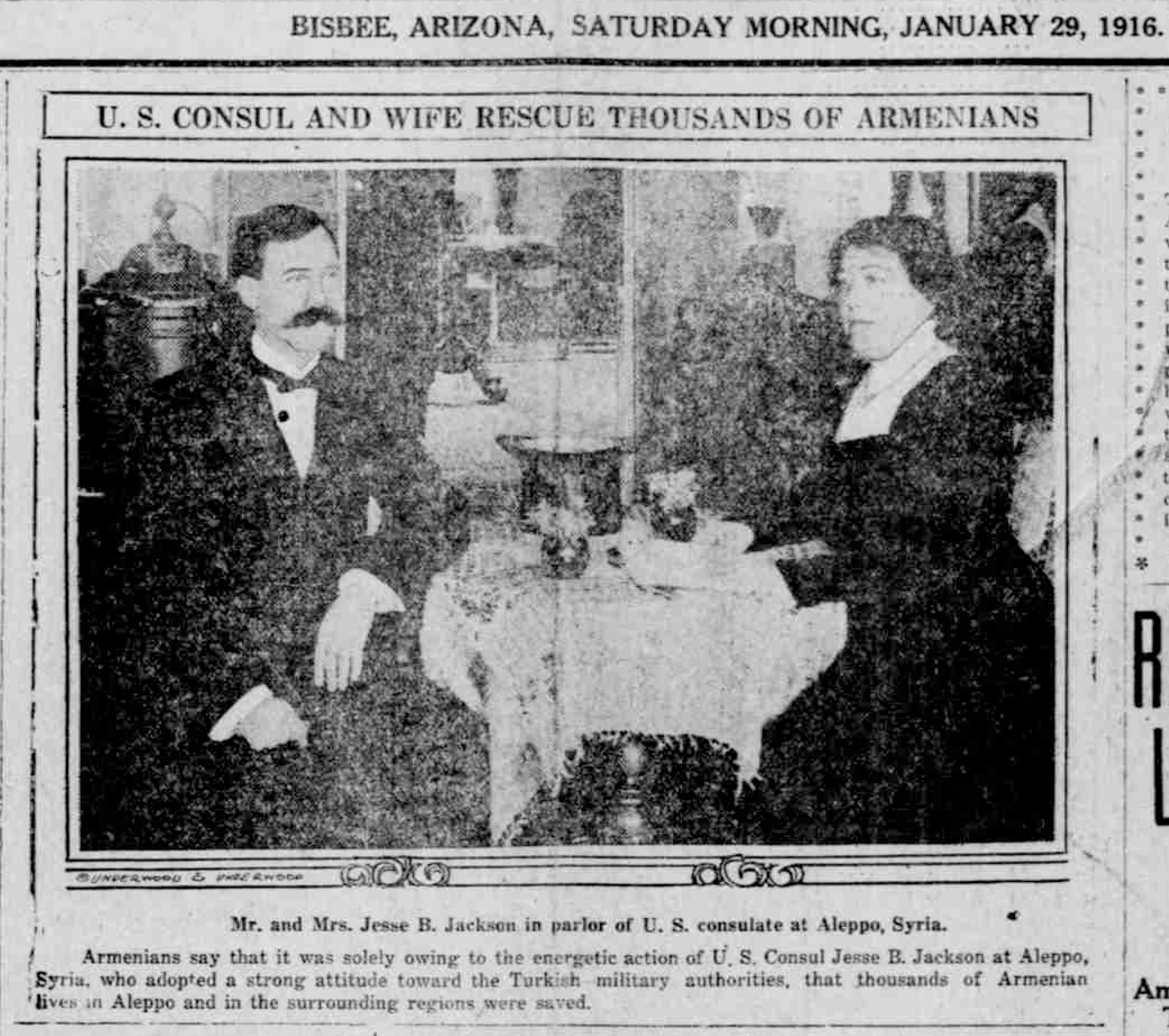
January 29, 1916, Bisbee Daily Review, "U.S. Consul and Wife Rescue Thousands of Armenians". Jackson is pictured with his wife with a caption that says, "Armenians say that it was solely owing to the energetic action of U.S. Consul Jesse B. Jackson at Aleppo, Syria, who adopted a strong attitude toward the Turkish military authorities, that thousands of Armenian lives in Aleppo and in the surrounding regions were saved."

Jackson also reported that those who were deported from Urfa were never heard of again, "though I sent a trustworthy Mohammedan on a five weeks journey throughout the interior into which they had disappeared to make a diligent search for any of the survivors, and I personally made many inquiries to that end. Without a doubt they suffered the fate of their fellow townsmen when at a safe distance from the city, and their bones lie bleaching in the sun and sands of the vast Mesopotamian desert."

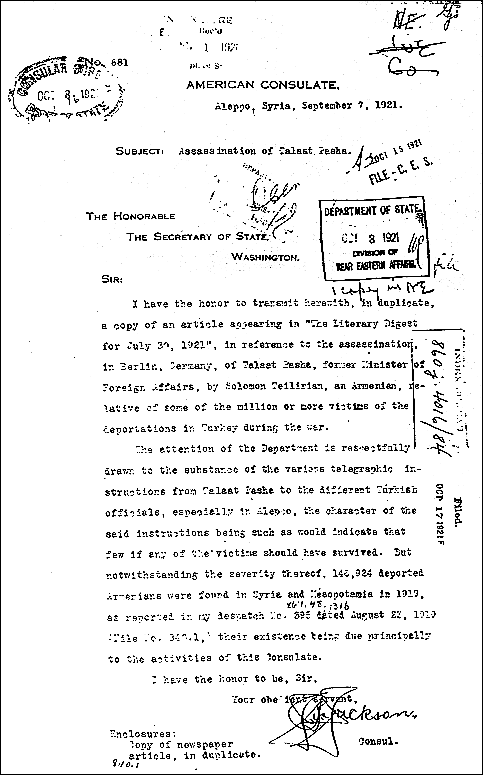
A telegraph sent by Jackson to Secretary of State. The telegraph describes Talat Pasha's ordering of massacres: "The attention of the Department is respectfully drawn to the substance of the various telegraphic instructions from Talaat Pasha to the different Turkish officials, especially in Aleppo, the character of the said instructions being such as would indicate that few if any of the victims should have survived."

In October 1916, Jackson depicted the circumstances of those who were deported in caravans: "For another five days they [the Armenians] did not receive a morsel of bread, neither a drop of water. They were scorched to death by thirst, hundreds upon hundreds fell dead along the way, their tongues turned to charcoal. ... On the seventy-fifth day when they reached Halep [Aleppo] 150 women and children remained from the whole caravan of 18,000."

Jackson estimated that of the million Armenians who had been deported to Syria, about 100,000 survived and many other women and children were still held in captivity. In 1918, he reported that survivors had recounted to him:

The harrowing details of the separation of the grown male members of their families therefrom, or the actual killing of them before the eyes of, their relatives and friends, or of the robbing of the emigrants en route, of the unlimited suffering and death of famished women and children, the unbelievable brutality of the accompanying gendarmes towards young girls and more attractive women, the carrying off by the Kurds and Turks of beautiful girls, women, and children, and countless other atrocious crimes committed against them all along the way.

Jackson was later instrumental in organizing the relief effort sponsored by the American Committee for Relief in the Near East for the victims. The fund, which managed to collect initial funds of $100,000, assigned Jackson to administrate and manage its finances. He estimated that the minimum provisions to sustain life would require about $150,000 a month, or a dollar a day per capita. Under his supervision, Jackson upheld the task of caring for an estimated 150,000 refugees. Due to these efforts, he is credited with saving the lives of "thousands of Armenians."

On May 13, 1923, Jackson's duties at the American consulate of Aleppo ended when he was reassigned to the consulate of Leghorn, Italy.

== Later life ==
Jackson served the American consulate in Leghorn until 1928 when he was reassigned to Fort William and Port Arthur in Canada. He subsequently resided there and ultimately retired in 1935. Jackson died on December 6, 1947, at the White Cross Hospital after suffering a short illness and is buried in Sunset Cemetery in Galloway, Ohio.

In 1898, Jackson married Rosabelle Berryman, who died in 1928. They had a son named Virgil A. Jackson.

Jackson was honoured with: Officer (Knight) of the Order of the Crown of Italy, Honorary Medal for Charitable Assistance (Netherlands), and the Order of Merit (Lebanon).

== See also ==
- Witnesses and testimonies of the Armenian genocide
- Ottoman Empire-United States relations

== Bibliography ==
- Lewy, Guenter (2005). The Armenian Massacres in Ottoman Turkey: A Disputed Genocide. University of Utah Press. ISBN 0874808499.
- Winter, J. M. (2003). America and the Armenian Genocide of 1915. Cambridge University Press. ISBN 9780511163821.
- Payaslian, Simon (2005). United States Policy Toward the Armenian Question and the Armenian Genocide. Palgrave Macmillan. ISBN 9781403978400.
- Goldhagen, Daniel Jonah (2009). Worse Than War: Genocide, Eliminationism, and the Ongoing Assault on Humanity. PublicAffairs. ISBN 978-0786746569.
- Sarafian, Ara (1995). United States official documents on the Armenian genocide. Armenian Review. ISBN 0935353003.
- Kevorkian, Raymond (2011). The Armenian Genocide: A Complete History. I.B. Tauris. ISBN 9780857719300.
- Dadrian, Vahakn (2003). The History of the Armenian Genocide: Ethnic Conflict from the Balkans to Anatolia to the Caucasus. Berghahn Books. ISBN 1571816666.
- Balakian, Peter (2009a). The Burning Tigris. HarperCollins. ISBN 978-0061860171.
- Balakian, Peter (2009b). Black Dog of Fate: A Memoir. Basic Books. ISBN 978-0786743704.
- Hovannisian, Richard (2003). Looking Backward, Moving Forward: Confronting the Armenian Genocide. Transaction Publishers. ISBN 1412827671.
- Forsythe, David P. (2009). Encyclopedia of Human Rights, Volume 1. Oxford University Press. ISBN 978-0195334029.
- Akçam, Taner (2012). The Young Turks' Crime Against Humanity: The Armenian Genocide and Ethnic Cleansing in the Ottoman Empire. Princeton University Press. ISBN 978-0691153339. - Profile at Google Books
- Balakian, Grigoris (2010). Armenian Golgotha: A Memoir of the Armenian Genocide, 1915-1918. Random House LLC. ISBN 978-1400096770.
- Pomakoy, Keith (2011). Helping Humanity: American Policy and Genocide Rescue. Lexington Books. ISBN 978-0739139189.
- Bjørnlund, Matthias (2011). Herzog, Dagmar (ed.). 'A Fate Worse Than Dying': Sexual Violence during the Armenian Genocide (PDF). Palgrave Macmillan. ISBN 978-0230285637.
