= Ali Ferruh Bey =

Ottoman Empire diplomat

Ali Ferruh Bey (5 June 1865–20 October 1904) was an Ottoman Empire envoy to the United States. Sinan Kuneralp, author of "Ottoman Diplomatic and Consular Personnel in the United States of America, 1867–1917," described him as the most well-known Ottoman envoy to the U.S.

The Ottoman Ministry of Foreign Affairs prohibited Muslim employees in the diplomatic service from bringing their families, yet Ali Ferruh brought his wife and her family to the U.S. Kuneralp concluded that he was "obviously a man of resources".

In 1900 he was recalled and replaced by Mustafa Shekib Bey.

== See also ==
- Ottoman Empire-United States relations
