= Mustafa Shekib Bey =

Turkish politician

Mustafa Shekib Bey (Turkish: Mustafa Şekip Bey), sometimes spelled Chekib, was an envoy of the Ottoman Empire to the United States.

He was appointed minister to the United States in 1900, replacing Ali Ferrouh Bey. The appointment was formally made on August 20, but Shekib did not arrive until September 1901. During Shekib's absence, Ferrouh served as the interim charge d'affairs. Shekib had two sons, and a wife who had died before he started his U.S. service.

Abdul Hamid II disliked it when the Americans pleaded for help for Armenians. As a result, he terminated the credentials of envoy Mustafa Shekib, and chose not to upgrade the mission to embassy status. Shekib therefore was unable to present his credentials to the President. Shekib slept in the daytime, and so his staff dealt with U.S. officials. Kuneralp stated that therefore "Things were eased out". Madame Bey, the wife of Shekib's secretary Sidky Bey, stated that the fact that he did not present any credentials was "an unparalleled case in the history of the diplomatic service."

Madame Bey stated that, in the words of Gene Pantalone, author of Madame Bey's, Shekib was "peculiar and superstitious", and Madame Bey wrote that Shekib's secretary Sjelal Munif Bey lived at Sidky Bey's house and at a house in New York instead of in the legation property "Owing to the peculiar but natural disposition of Shekib Bey". Pantalone himself described Shekib as "enigmatic".
