= Ahmet Rüstem Bey =

Polish-British Ottoman diplomat

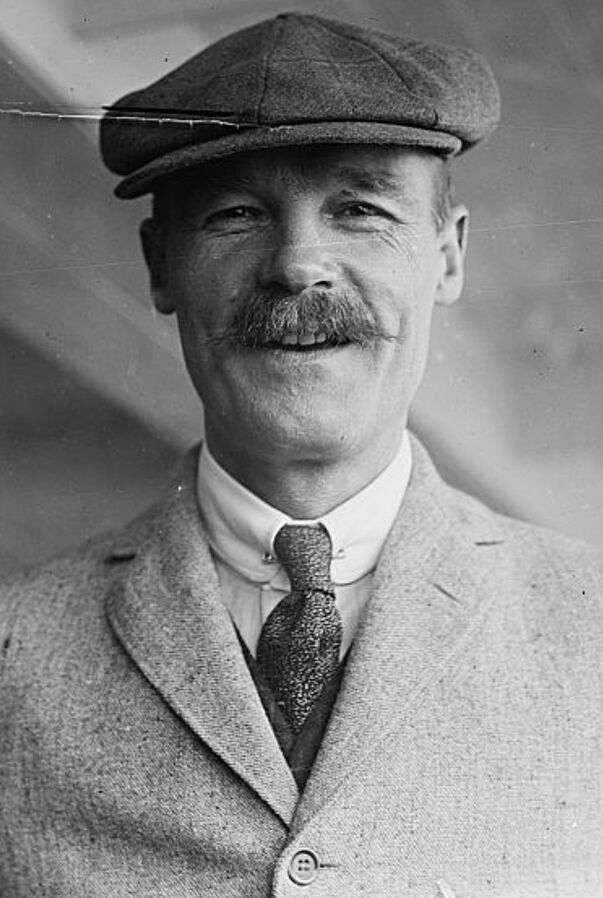
Ahmet Rüstem Bey during a report, on a boat, in Washington, America, September 1914

Ahmet Rüstem Bey (1862–1934), born Alfred Bilinski, (Note: Among the many variations on his name are: Alfred Bielinski, Alfred de Belinski, Ahmet Rüstem Bilinski and Ahmet Rüstem Pasha (Paşa). His original Polish surname had multiple spellings. Sinan Kuneralp writes that "he is indifferently known as Alfred de Bilinsky, Alfred Rustem, or Ahmed Rüstem". He writes his name as "Ahmed Rüstem de Bilinski" in some works.) , also sometimes called Alfred Rüstem Bey was an Ottoman diplomat who served as the last Ottoman ambassador to the United States in 1914. Despite neither of his parents being ethnically Turkish, he himself was an ardent Turkish nationalist. He was "exceptionally high-strung and outspoken" and had a "propensity to challenge people to duels". . He once challenged Mustafa Kemal Atatürk to a duel over a minor disagreement on dining etiquette. Prior to his appointment as ambassador, he had already served twice in the United States capital, both times leaving in a hurry.

== Early life ==
Ahmet Rüstem was born on Midilli (Mytilene), now Lesbos, Greece, to a Polish Jewish father, and a British Jewish mother. His father was an aristocrat who fled Poland after the failed revolution of 1848 and entered the Ottoman Ministry of Foreign Affairs as Sadreddin Nihad Pasha; a convert to Islam, he was born Seweryn Bielinski. Ahmet's mother was Mary Sandison, the daughter of a British consul in Bursa who previously did business in Constantinople (now Istanbul). Wasti stated that the family of Ahmet Rustem's maternal grandmother "is described as of Persian origin, and is possibly of Armenian antecedents."

His education occurred in Turkey. Besides his native English, Ahmet Rüstem could understand, read, and/or speak Arabic, French, German, Greek, Italian, Persian, and Turkish. Wasti stated that "several reports" stated that at 18 Ahmet Rüstem converted to Islam.

== Career ==
He followed his father in the foreign service. From 1881 to December 1885 he served his first posting as a French translator in a mission in Bulgaria, and in June 1886 he became the third secretary of the embassy in Athens, Greece. c. 1890 he was sent to Belgrade, Serbia and held that post for three months. He quit at that point but rejoined the Belgrade mission, now as a second secretary, as his employers increased his status. He subsequently held this status in Athens and then, from May 1893, in London, United Kingdom. Circa 1893/1894 he was moved to Bucharest, Romania, and now served as a first secretary. He held that status when he was moved to Washington DC in April 1897. That year he quit the service to serve in the Greco-Turkish War, and he received a medal in September of that year after fighting in the Battle of Domokos as an honorary captain; the Romanian government also gave him the third class Couronne de Roumanie. He rejoined the diplomatic service in Bucharest that same year, then moved to London in July 1898, and back to Washington in January 1899.

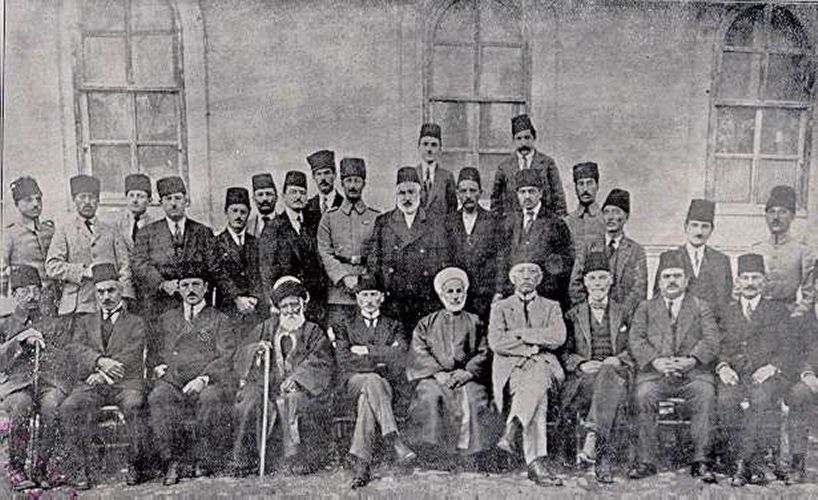
Sivas Congress. Ahmet Rüstem Bey is the third from the right in the first row.

Circa 1901, Ahmet Rustem encountered difficulty with his employers when he decided to report financial mismanagement at the Ottoman Legation in Washington, by writing an article to The Daily Mail in London and relocating to that city. He sent a letter to Costaki Anthopoulos, the empire's ambassador to the UK, saying that he would not resign, and that he would publish the correspondence in the UK if it was not published in the empire. The Ottoman government accused him of treason. Ahmet Rustem responded that he did not wish to return to the empire. Wasti stated "It appears that, as a result, Rüstem Bey probably became unemployed [or at least unsalaried]."

After spending periods in the UK, Malta, and Egypt, he was rehired or returned into the foreign service, as Abdulhamid II lost power in the failed Ottoman countercoup of 1909, and effective August 25 of that year, Ahmed Rustem became the chargé d'affaires in Washington. Circa April 1909 he was moved to Constantinople before being posted in an anti-financial fraud job in the embassy in Paris. Wasti wrote "The re-instatement of Ahmed Rüstem Bey indicates that the Porte had finally begun to appreciate the strict honesty and fairness that characterized him." In 1911 he headed the embassy in Cetinje, Montenegro, but left the service to fight as a private in the Balkan Wars after the Ottoman government returned him to the empire the following year.

In May 1914 The New York Times reported that he publicly announced his conversion from Christianity to Islam, and the man changed his name to Ahmet Rüstem. The Sultan of the Ottoman Empire gave a watch as a gift.

Ahmet Rustem took up the post of ambassador to the United States in June 1914. His first task was to defend his country's treatment of Armenians and to respond to the anti-Ottoman perspective of the American press. In September, he admitted that massacres had occurred in the past, but he argued that it was because of the Armenians' act of "political agitators engaged in undermining the Ottoman state while flaunting in the face of the government and dominant race the support of Russia, France and England." He then added that the Ottoman treatment of Armenians was no worse than American treatment of blacks (alluding to lynchings) or Filipinos (alluding to the so-called water cure). President Woodrow Wilson took great offense to this and a letter was sent to the Ottoman government informing them that Ahmet would no longer be of use to them in Washington, D.C. The United States did not label him persona non grata only because of the outbreak of World War I at the end of July. Ahmet defended his words in a letter to Secretary of State Robert Lansing, but the Ottoman government recalled him and he left in October. His duties were taken over by the chargé d'affaires Abdülhak Hüseyin Bey, who remained in office until the two countries severed relations on 20 April 1917 as the United States entered the war that the Ottomans had joined in November 1914.

The U.S. President in September 1914 asked Ahmet Rustem to stop writing comments against the U.S. in newspapers. That month he said he would not retract his statements and that he would no longer reside in the U.S. He left the U.S. on October 7, 1914. The New York Times wrote that his departure "created a sensation in Washington diplomatic circles."

== Post-career ==
In 1915, while in Switzerland, Ahmet Rustem wrote a book in French justifying Ottoman Armenian policy.

In 1919, Ahmet Rustem joined the Turkish National Movement. He worked closely with Mustafa Kemal at Sivas during the congress in September and again in November but the two had a falling out and by September 1920 Ahmet had left Turkey for voluntary exile in Europe. He never returned, although Kemal eventually gave him a pension.

The New York Times reported his death on 25 September 1934. Wasti stated that the article is proof that he died in 1934 even though "the majority of sources" stated that 1935 was the year he died.

== Personal life ==
Not much has been disclosed of Ahmet Rüstem's personal life, but it is known that he was married to a woman. In his article's notes, Wasti stated that an article in The New York Times was "the only evidence available that Ahmed Rüstem Bey was married."

Şenol Kantarcı, author of Osmanlı' da Onurlu bir Diplomat ve Milli Mücadele'nin Önemli Siması Ahmed Rüstem Bey (Alfred Bielinski – Alfred Rüstem Bey) (translation: "Ahmed Rüstem Bey: An Honourable Ottoman Diplomat and an Important Figure in the National Struggle (Alfred Bielinski – Alfred Rüstem Bey)"), stated that he tried to find any proof that Ahmet Rustem had children in the Retirement Fund Office archives but could not find any.

== Writings ==
The original French version of La guerre mondiale et la question Turco-Arménienne ("The World War and the Turco-Armenian Question")

His writings include:

- "The Turkish Revolution." The Nineteenth Century and After, Volume 64 (1908), page 354.
- La guerre mondiale et la question Turco-Arménienne. Stämpfli (Bern, Switzerland), 1918. - Wasti wrote that sections of the work's preface "shed light on the nature, character and aspirations of Ahmed Rüstem Bey."
  - English translation by Stephen Cambron, as The World War and the Turco-Armenian Question. The e-book was made available online. There is also a Turkish translation.
- Le crise proche-orientale et la question des détroits de Constantinople (The Near Eastern Crisis and the Question of the Straits of Constantinople), 1922. Syed Tanvir Wasti stated in "Ahmed Rüstem Bey and the End of an Era" that this work was published in Rome, Italy but that the publisher was not known.
- "La Paix d'Orient et l'accord franco-turc" (Peace in the East and the Franco-Turkish Accord). L'Orient et Occident (1922).
- "The Future of the Oecumenical Patriarchate." Foreign Affairs, Volume 3, Issue 4 (1925), pages 604–10.
- "Turkey Taking Her Place among Modern Nations." Current History, Volume 25 (1927), page 670.
- "Die Zukunft der Türkei." Zeitschrift für Politik, Volume 20 (April 1930).
- La Turquie devant le tribunal mondial – son passé, son présent, son avenir. Wasti stated that this work had not been located.

Wasti stated "Work needs to be done even to compile a reliable list of the writings of Ahmed Rüstem Bey."
