= Thadée Gasztowtt =

French-born Ottoman diplomat and historian (1881–1936)

Thadée Gasztowtt Bey
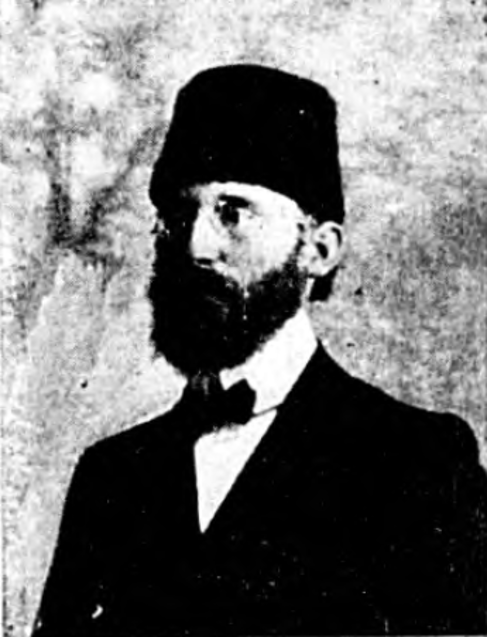
- 1909 portrait of Gasztowtt

Personal details
- Born: 8 June 1881 Paris, French Third Republic
- Died: 22 January 1936 (aged 54) Istanbul, Turkey
- Occupation: Diplomat, journalist, author, historian

Military service
- Branch/service: Ottoman Army, Ottoman Empire; Polish Legion in France
- Battles/wars: Italo-Turkish War; World War I; Western Front

Thadée Gasztowtt (8 June 1881 – 22 January 1936), also known as Seyfeddin Bey (Ottoman Turkish: سيفددڭ بك), was a French-born Ottoman, Turkish, and Polish diplomat, revolutionary, historian, and journalist of noble Lithuanian descent. An ardent Turkophile, he adamantly advocated for the revitalisation of Ottoman–Polish relations and was a staunch supporter of the Ottoman Empire, viewing it as Poland's only historical ally. As the unofficial representative of Polish émigrés, he regularly encouraged Poles in Europe, especially Francophone Poles, to support the Ottoman Empire.

== Early life ==
=== Background ===
Gasztowtt was born Thadée Arthur Maurice Gasztowtt on 8 June 1881 in Paris, France, to a Polish political émigré family hailing from the noble Lithuanian Goštautai family. He had an older brother, François (1874–1904), who died in Tunis. Gasztowtt's grandfather, Maurycy (Maurice) Gasztowtt (1809–1871), who was a participant of the November uprising, fled to France in the 1830s and never returned to Poland. Thadée's father was Wacław (Venceslas) Gasztowtt (1844–1920), born in La Guerche-sur-l'Aubois and died in Paris. He worked at the Polish National High School at Batignolles, and was editor-in-chief of the monthly journal Bulletin Polonais, published between 1875 and 1922. The Paris-based journal was a vital source of information about Poland's literary, historical, and political state for Polish émigrés in France.

=== Education and career ===
Thadée Gasztowtt was educated at Collège Chaptal. He went on to study history at the University of Paris, but did not graduate. Gasztowtt, like his father, also worked at Bulletin Polonais, though as a journalist. This is when he started to write about Poland's relationship with the Ottoman Empire. His main focuses were that of Polish–Ottoman friendship stemming from centuries of established relations, both countries sharing borders for centuries and thus having common enemies and mutual interests, the welcoming of Polish émigrés to the Ottoman Empire in the 19th century, as well as the need for a rapprochement between both countries.

== Life in the Ottoman Empire ==
=== Emigration and first years ===
Gasztowtt arrived in Istanbul in 1907 for journalistic purposes and as a French teacher. He was an avid supporter of the Young Turks, a political reform movement in the early 20th century that favored the replacement of the Ottoman Empire's absolute monarchy with a constitutional government. After the 1908 Young Turk Revolution, he started to engage in the Ottoman public sphere.

In the Second Constitutional Era, Gasztowtt worked as a renowned journalist in numerous Istanbul-based pro-Committee of Union and Progress (CUP) newspapers. He is described by German orientalist Martin Hartmann as one of the Europeans who desired a role in Turkish politics. Gasztowtt went by the name "Seyfeddin" or "Seyfeddin T. Gasztowtt" in the Ottoman Empire after his conversion to Islam. He most prominently published the pro-government bi-weekly journal Kürsi-i Milel/La Tribune des Peuples (The People's Tribune) alongside an Egyptian nationalist, Hüseyin Hasib Bey, from 29 April to 24 June 1910. The main focuses of the journal was to inform the Ottoman people of Muslim countries and people who were suffering from oppression under colonialism, as well as reporting on the international affairs of the country.

=== 1909 Ottoman–Polish celebrations ===
Gasztowtt convinced the Young Turks to organise celebrations in August 1909 in memory of the thousands of Poles who had served the Ottoman Empire in the Crimean War, especially Adam Mickiewicz. Widely regarded as Poland's greatest poet and writer, Mickiewicz served in the Crimean War under the auspices of the Polish Legion in Turkey, and died in Istanbul. The celebrations were very popular across the Ottoman Empire and Partitioned Poland, with the events being described by Polish journal Tygodnik Illustrowany (Illustrated Magazine) as "since the partitions no one had seen a similar celebration for Poland".

The first part of the celebration consisted of participants practicing mass at the Church of St. Mary Draperis in Istanbul. After this, celebrators would walk to Mickiewicz's house in Tarlabaşı, waving the Polish and Ottoman flags. Soon thereafter, a commemorative plaque was built at Mickiewicz's house, which was burned down in 1870 but rebuilt by the Ottoman–Polish community, and eventually made a museum by the Turkish government in 1955. Gasztowtt would organise another celebration soon, this time an appreciation of the Ottoman Empire's warm welcoming of political émigrés. In both occasions, he stressed the issue of Polish independence to the Ottoman public.

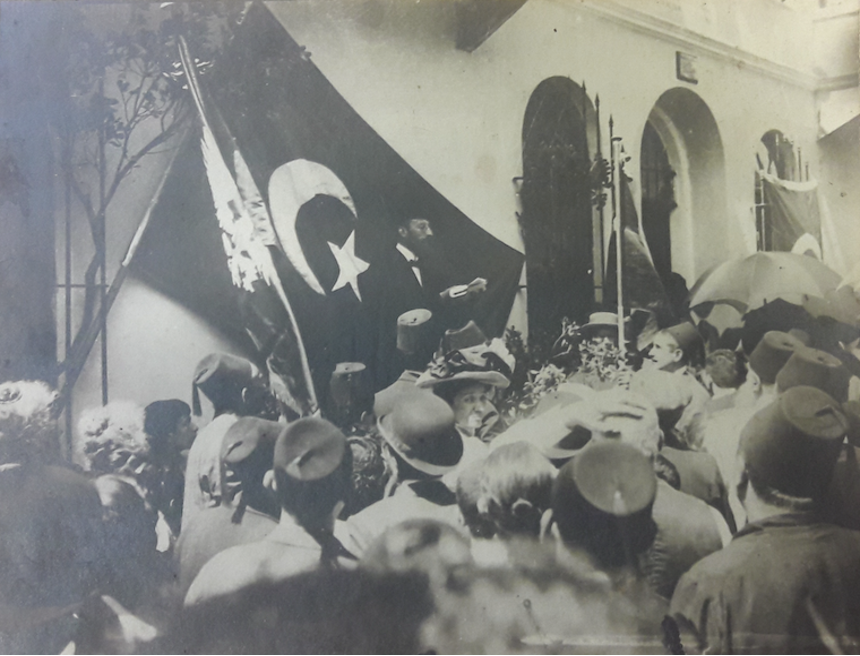
Gasztowtt giving a speech in front of Adam Mickiewicz's house on 17 August 1909 in Istanbul to many notable attendees

Gasztowtt gave a speech in front of Mickiewicz's house on 17 August 1909 as part of the aforementioned celebrations. There were many notable attendees, such as the future last Caliph of the Ottoman Empire Abdulmejid II, a CUP delegation consisting of high-ranking members such as Doctor Nazım, Rıza Tevfik Bölükbaşı, Selahaddin Bey, veterans of the Crimean War, colonel Halil Sami Bey, and Gasztowtt's close friend Celal Nuri İleri. Others who were present included the representative of the Khedive of Egypt Fazıl Bey, son of Emir Abdelkader, Abdurrahman Pasha, Imam Shamil's grandson, Ziya Ahmed Bey, descendant of the last Crimean Khan Şahin Giray, Mustafa Hasan Bey, members of the Persian Committee and Universal Association of Russian Muslims. Further notables were secretaries general of the World Zionist Congress Nahum Sokolow, and Polish Committee in Istanbul Michał Grabowski, as well as Leon Walerian Ostroróg, a delegation from Adampol, and the owner of Mickiewicz's house, Marcin Ratyński.

Others also took part in the speech. Selahaddin Bey stressed that the partition of Poland was a "sacrilegious act", and that the Ottoman Empire did not recognise it. (Note: The Ottoman Empire was the only country to officially disregard the partitions of Poland, retaining the position of Ambassador of Lehistan (Poland). Also see Arrival of the deputy of Lehistan.) Selahaddin Bey also confirmed the CUP's utmost support for Polish independence to attendees. Gasztowtt responded by advocating for the revitalisation of Ottoman–Polish relations. Bulletin Polonais branded the event as a "real lesson of tolerance" with many Muslims and Imams attending the mass and sacrificing lambs in remembrance of Poles who died. The Tanin newspaper also celebrated not only Polish soldiers who had died in the Crimean War but those who had served the Sublime Porte for years, to underline the historical basis of Ottoman–Polish cooperation.

=== Military service ===
During his time in the Ottoman Empire, Gasztowtt attempted to convince Minister of War Mahmud Shevket Pasha to establish a foreign legion in the country, convinced that it would attract many Polish volunteers, much like the previous Polish Legions in Turkey. There were multiple Polish legions in the Ottoman Empire, the first was the 1797 legion organised by M. Denisko, second the 1849 Polish and Sultanic Cossacks’ legions established in Vidin by Michał Czajkowski and Władysław Stanisław Zamoyski, third the 1877 Polish legion founded by Józef Jagmin. Gasztowtt convinced future Chief of State of the Second Polish Republic, Józef Piłsudski, then leader of the Polish Socialist Party, to support him in his endeavours. He believed that the legion would be large enough to participate in the Polish independence struggle. The plan was abandoned with the 1913 assassination of Mahmud Shevket Pasha.

One of the main factors that inspired Gasztowtt to serve the Ottoman Empire was his belief that the Ottomans were the only allies of the Poles throughout history, romanticising the Ottoman support of Poland. Gasztowtt volunteered in the Ottoman army during the Italo-Turkish War. In World War I, he served in the Polish Legion in France on the Western Front, but returned to Istanbul after the re-establishment of a Polish state.

== Later life ==
=== Diplomatic career ===
In 1914, Gasztowtt was appointed as the Secretary of the newly established Ottoman consulate general in Salonika, which the country had lost during the Balkan Wars. Due to his vast connections in the Ottoman Empire, he was at the forefront of Poland-Turkey relations till his death. Thanks to his diplomatic experience, he successfully oversaw the rapprochement between the Sublime Porte during the Turkish War of Independence as well as the Government of the Grand National Assembly at Ankara with the Polish government. On 17 November 1919, Gasztowtt was appointed as First Class Secretary of the Polish delegation to the Ottoman Empire. After meeting with Mustafa Kemal Atatürk in April 1921 in Ankara, he successfully had the Polish government establish a permanent diplomatic presence in Turkey. Gasztowtt was appointed as the First Class Secretary of the Polish delegation to Turkey on 29 December 1922 but was dismissed from his role on 30 November 1923 and sent to Poland for unknown reasons.

Gasztowtt worked as a correspondent for the magazine L’Est Européen (The European East) in Warsaw during his absence from Turkey. In 1928, he would return to Ankara as the press attaché of the Polish government's delegation to Turkey, which became the Embassy of Poland in Ankara in 1930. Gasztowtt's influence in his later life was not as considerable as in his youth.

=== Death ===
Gasztowtt died in Istanbul on 22 January 1936. He was buried at the Pangaltı Catholic Cemetery, Feriköy, Şişli, Istanbul, despite being a Muslim. Gasztowtt may have converted back to Christianity.

== Works ==
=== La Pologne et l'Islam ===
During his first six years in the Ottoman Empire, Gasztowtt released two major works. The first, published in 1907, was La Pologne et l'Islam (Poland and Islam). In this book, he stressed how Poland and Turkey held a friendship that had lasted for centuries, stating that both countries shared borders for centuries and thus were united due to their common interests and enemies throughout history. The book was very well received at the time since it provided people with information surrounding Poland's relationships with Turkey and Islam in general, especially post-Partition, that was rarely known. Gasztowtt's work continues to be used by modern Polish historians who write on Ottoman–Polish history.

=== Turcya a Polska ===
In 1913, he released another book by the name of Turcya a Polska (Turkey and Poland), this time aimed at a Polish audience unlike his previous book that was written in French. Directly inspired by the Italo-Turkish and Balkan Wars, Gasztowtt detailed the Ottoman policies in the Balkans and advocated for stronger cooperation between Poland and the Ottoman Empire. In both books, Gasztowtt gives his opinion on many issues surrounding the Ottoman Empire, and held a very pro-Ottoman view in regards to their conflicts, advocating for the country to defend themselves against the expansionist European powers. One of his beliefs was that "only the Ottoman government fought loyally and invariably for the reestablishment of our national independence."

On 9 October 1920, Gasztowtt was awarded the Maarif Nişanı (Education Order) by Sultan Mehmed VI for his works, an award given to "extraordinary services rendered to education" if the recipient was not a professional teacher or professor.
