= Battle of Coștangalia =

Battle between Romania and Polish Rebels

- Part of the January Uprising
Date	15 July 1863
Location	Near Coștangalia, Romanian United Principalities (now located in Moldova)
Result	Polish victory

Belligerents
Polish National Government; Polish insurgents	Romanian United Principalities

Commanders and leaders
Zygmunt Miłkowski; Józef Jagmin	Athanasie Călinescu

Strength
213 soldiers	1,260 soldiers; 60 Cavalry

Casualties and losses
6 dead; 25 wounded	18 dead; 40 wounded

The battle of Coștangalia (Note: Polish: bitwa pod Kostangalią, bitwa pod Costangalią; Romanian: bătălia de la Coștangalia) was the battle fought on 15 July 1863, near the village of Coștangalia, Romanian United Principalities (now located in Moldova). It was fought by the Romanian forces, against the Polish rebels marching through territory of Romanian United Principalities, to join the rebels fighting in the January Uprising, in Poland.

== Background ==
Following the start of the January Uprising in January 1863 in Poland by the insurgent forces against the Russian Empire, the government of the Ottoman Empire, allowed Polish expatriates to form revolutionary forces on their territory that would aid the rebellion in Poland. The unit was formed in the city of Tulcea, and included 213 armed people. It was commanded by colonel Zygmunt Miłkowski. The unit marched through Ottoman territory towards the border of the Romanian United Principalities, with the plan of crossing its territory, to reach the Bessarabia Governorate, Russian Empire, and then move to the Podolian Governorate, where they hoped to reactivate fighting in the region of modern Ukraine.

== Battle ==
After the Polish insurrectionaries crossed the border, Alexandru Ioan Cuza, the ruler of the Romanian United Principalities, sent forces to stop them from marching through his country. These forces (a regiment from Ismail, with reinforcements from Galați and Reni) consisted of 7 companies of infantry, counting 1,260 soldiers, with additional aid of 60 cavalrymen, all commanded by colonel Athanasie Călinescu. The Polish insurrectionaries were ordered to disarm, which they refused. As such, both sides began the fight on 15 July 1863, near the village of Coștangalia (now located in Moldova).

Miłkowski ordered the infantry under the command of Józef Jagmin to scatter across the valley. On the right wing, the insurgents had captured local houses, and on the left, they had hidden behind trees. Soon after that, the Romanian forces began firing at the insurgents. In response, Polish infantry charged at the enemy. At the same time, the Romanian cavalry charged and defeated the soldiers with bayonets, while the central line of the Romanian forces had been breached by the insurgents. Due to the casualties and the chaos of the battlefield, most of the Romanian forces retreated. The exception was the left wing of the infantry, which charged at Polish forces. However, they were not able to reach their target, and under heavy fire, were forced to retreat as well.

== Aftermath ==
Although Miłkowski's detachment had emerged successful from the engagement at Coștangalia, the Romanian authorities, eager to demonstrate that the United Principalities were observing their declared neutrality, continued to follow and pressure the insurgents. The Polish column fell back towards Ismail and crossed the Prut River. Two days later, on 17 July, with little prospect of being allowed to march on to the Russian border, the insurgents surrendered their weapons to Romanian troops and were interned at Cahul. Subsequently, they were allowed to leave their place of internment and travel on to Poland individually, but without their weapons.
