= Poland–Turkey relations =

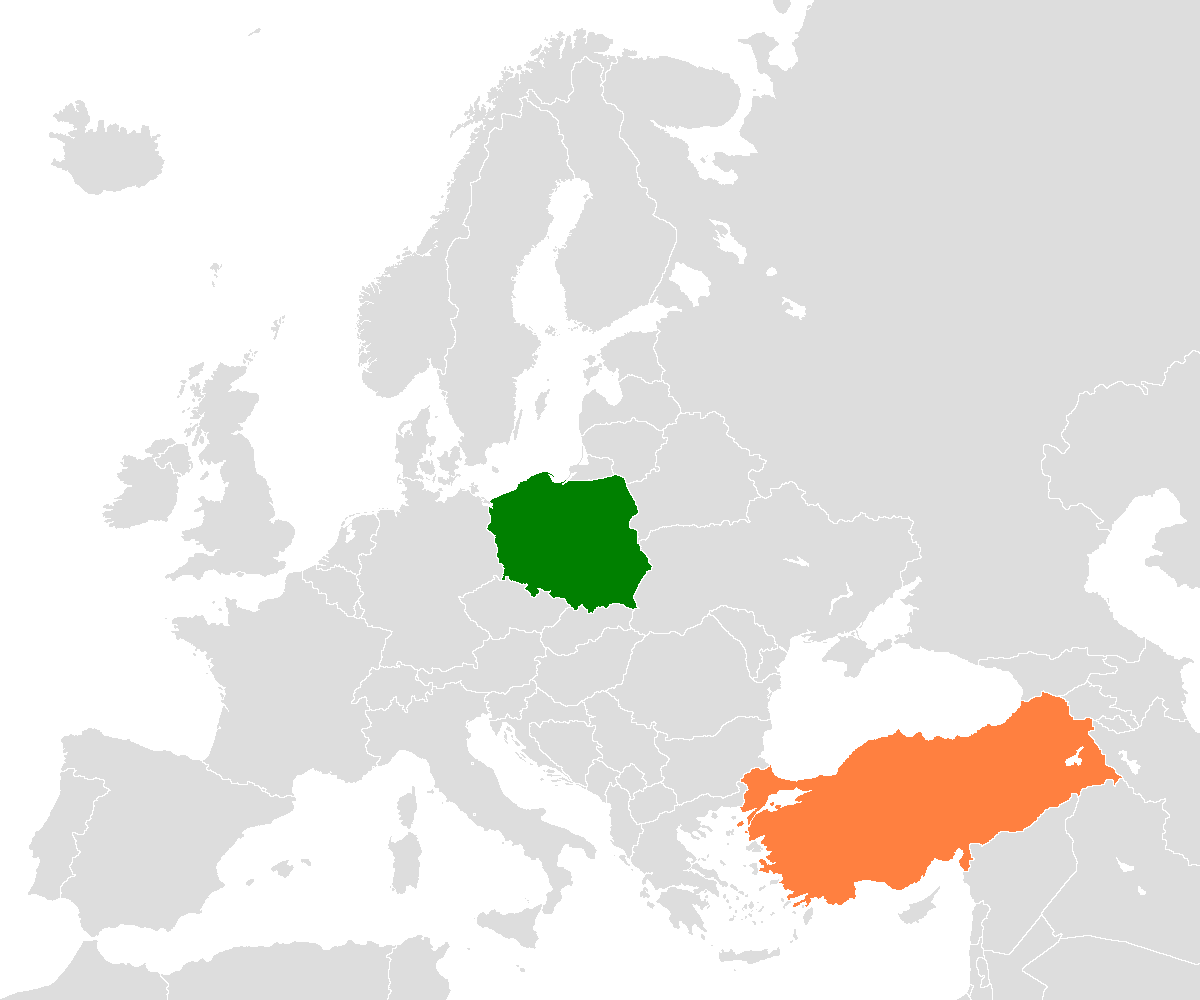
- Poland: Turkey

Diplomatic mission
- Embassy of Poland, Ankara: Embassy of Turkey, Warsaw

Poland–Turkey relations are the foreign relations between Poland and Turkey. Both countries are full members of NATO, OECD, OSCE, the Union for the Mediterranean, the Council of Europe and the World Trade Organisation. Poland is an EU member and Turkey is an EU candidate. Poland supports Turkey's accession negotiations to the EU, although negotiations have now been suspended.

History of the diplomatic relations between the two nations dates back to the 15th century when the Kingdom of Poland and the Ottoman Empire officially established them. Both considered great powers in the late medieval and early modern periods, the two nations have experienced periods of intense geopolitical rivalry with several wars, as well as long periods of peace with fruitful cooperation, intense trade and some cultural exchange. Poland and Turkey share many similarities in their cultural history and cuisine and generally relations between the two nations are good.

== History ==
=== Early history ===
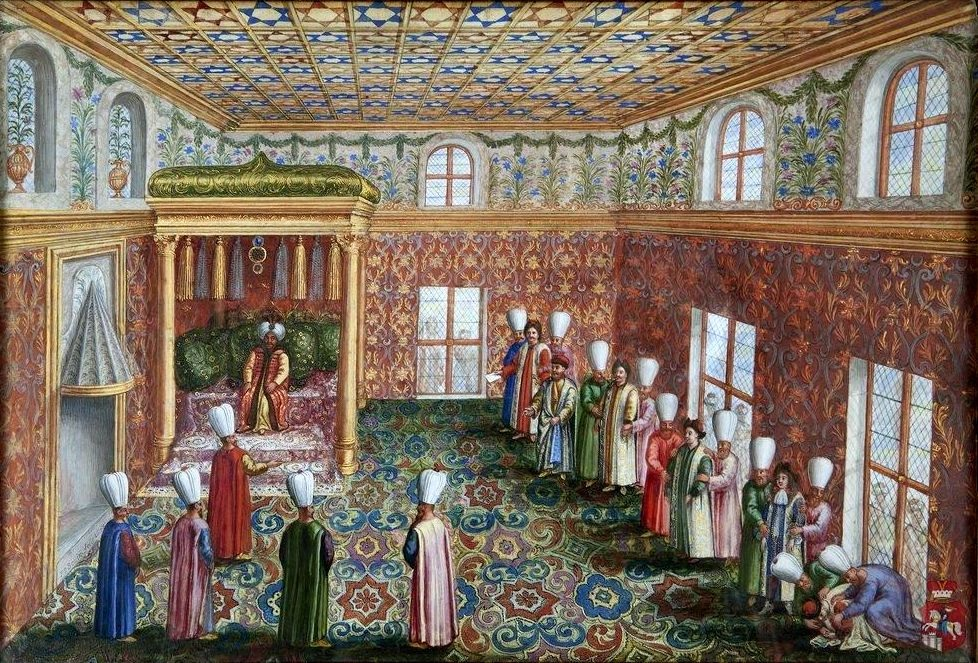
Polish Ambassador Jan Gniński at the court of Sultan Mehmed IV in 1679

Polish-Turkish relations have been historically close yet complex. Historically, the Polish–Lithuanian Commonwealth had a direct border with the Ottoman Empire, both states had a tumultuous history being in open and consistent warfare between one another for centuries, particularly in the southeastern borderlands of the Polish–Lithuanian Commonwealth around Moldavia, modern-day Ukraine, Romania and Crimea. Troops from the Kingdom of Poland were part of a large European coalition that tried to repel the Ottoman invasion of Europe at the Battle of Nicopolis in 1396. Warfare between both states began in 1443 with the Crusade of Varna. Further wars were fought in 1485–1503, 1620-1621, 1633–1634, 1672–1676, and 1683–1699, and the Poles and Turks also clashed in the Moldavian Magnate Wars. During the wars, sections of the Polish–Lithuanian Commonwealth fell under the direct administration of the Ottoman Empire under the Podolia Eyalet or Silistra Eyalet for some time. The victory of Polish-led forces at the Battle of Vienna in 1683 marked the end of Ottoman advances into Europe.

Diplomatic relations between the Ottoman Empire and the Polish–Lithuanian Commonwealth were established in the 15th century. In 1414, Ottoman Sultan Mehmed I Çelebi received the first Polish diplomatic delegation at his court in Bursa, at the time the capital of the Ottoman Empire. In 1489, the Ottoman Sultan allowed Polish merchants to conduct trade in the entire Ottoman Empire.

=== 18th and 19th centuries ===
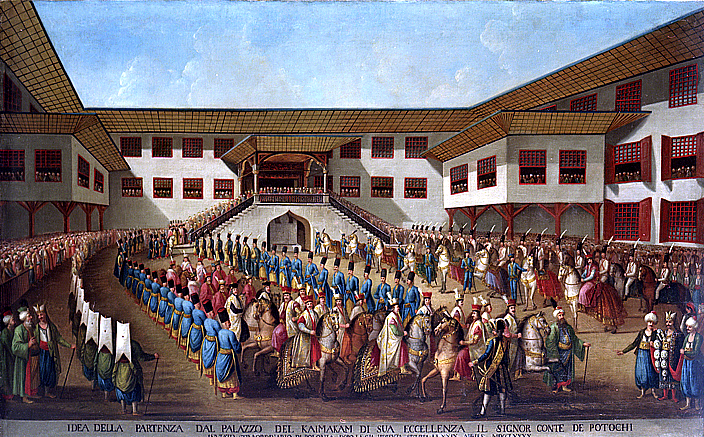
Procession of Piotr Potocki, the last envoy of the Polish-Lithuanian Commonwealth in Istanbul in 1790. The Commonwealth ceased to exist with the Third Partition of Poland in 1795. Ottoman Turkey never recognised the Partitions and continued to reserve a seat for the "Envoy of Lehistan" at diplomatic audiences until the reestablishment of the Polish nation after World War I.

Turkish support for the Polish Bar Confederation against Russia sparked the Russo-Turkish War of 1768–1774. Following the Partitions of Poland, the Ottoman Empire was the only major country that did not recognise the final partition of the Polish–Lithuanian Commonwealth. An anecdote exists recounting the exchange between the chef de protocol and his aide of the Ottoman Empire which is widely recounted today in Poland. According to the tale, whenever the diplomatic corps was received by the Ottoman sultan, on the sight of the empty chair of the Polish deputy, the Ottoman chef de protocol would ostentatiously ask: “Where is the deputy from Lehistan?”. On each occasion he would receive the same reply from his aide: ‘Your Excellency, the deputy of Lehistan could not make it because of vital impediments’ to the annoyance of the diplomats from the partitioning states. The first written record of this story comes from the Polish ambassador to Turkey in the years 1936 – 45, Michał Sokolnicki (1880 – 1967). He heard it from a Turkish officer and statesman, Ali Fuat Cebesoy (1882 – 1968), who was acquainted with the Istanbul Polish community. Cebesoy claimed that this symbolic exchange continued until the end of the sultanate and he witnessed it in person as a young officer during the reign of Sultan Abdülhamid II (r. 1876 – 1909)

In the 19th century, many Polish veterans of the November Uprising, January Uprising, and Crimean War arrived in Turkey. Polish officers, such as Michał Czajkowski, served in the Ottoman Army. Polish General Marian Langiewicz spent the last years of his life in Turkey, fought in the Ottoman Army, and died in Istanbul, where he is buried at the Haydarpaşa Cemetery. Polish national poet Adam Mickiewicz spent the last months of his life in Istanbul and died there. The house where he lived was later transformed into the Adam Mickiewicz Museum. In 1877, the Polish Legion in Turkey was formed and it fought alongside Turks in the Russo-Turkish War of 1877–1878.

The village of Polonezköy (Adampol), which lies on the Anatolian side of Istanbul, was first settled in 1842 by Polish veterans of the November Uprising. Further Polish settlers arrived in the 19th and 20th centuries. As of 2009, there is still a Polish minority in the village.

=== 20th century ===
The alliance between Poland and Turkey remained strong into the 20th century. Poland was the first country in Europe to recognize the Turkish Republic declared by Mustafa Kemal Atatürk in 1923.

During the German-Soviet invasion of Poland, which started World War II in 1939, Turkish authorities agreed to transport evacuated Polish gold through Turkish territory to Polish-allied France and the Polish embassy in Ankara remained operational throughout the war.

In the times of the Cold War, Poland and Turkey were part of two enemy military alliances — the Warsaw Pact and NATO respectively. However, after the collapse of Communism in Eastern Europe, the relations between the two countries were restored in the early 1990s. Poland's accession to NATO in 1999 further bolstered the close relationship. Poland's bid to become a NATO member state was supported by Turkey.

== Recent relations ==
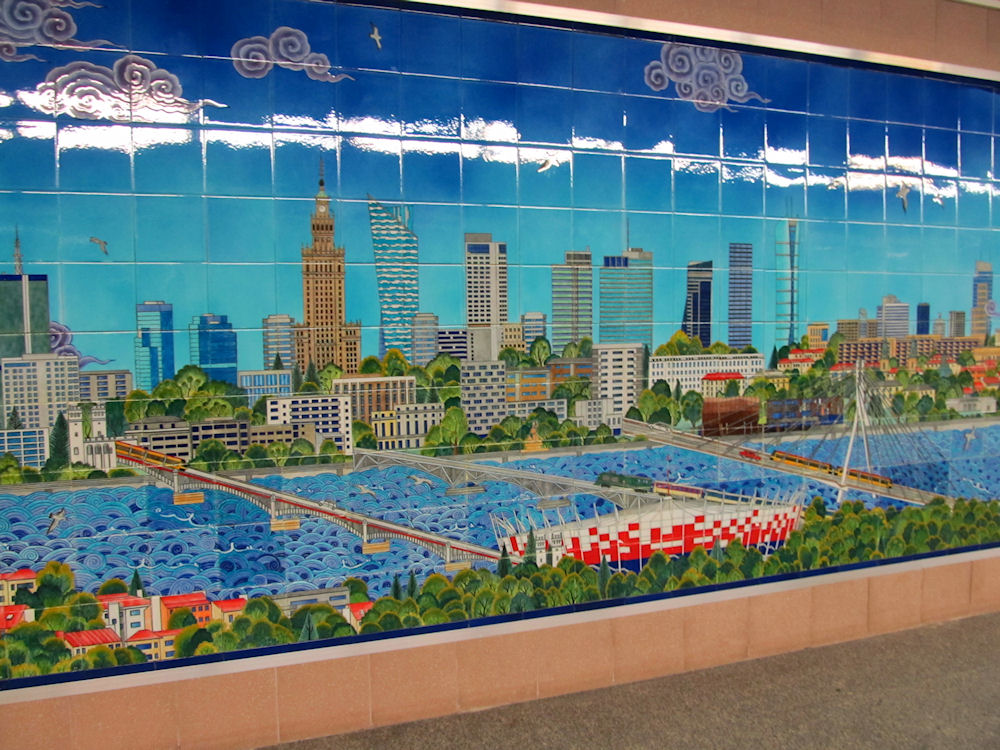
Turkish mosaic depicting Warsaw and Istanbul at the Politechnika metro station in Warsaw, installed in 2015 to commemorate 600 years of Poland–Turkey relations.

Although Turkey and Poland enjoy good relations, the relationship between the two countries has occasionally been tense in recent times. Poland was one of the main countries that condemned the Turkish invasion of Cyprus and affirmed its stance for a united Cyprus. Moreover, in 2005, Poland officially recognized the Armenian genocide, which resulted in strong protests from Turkey and a cancellation of a meeting between a Turkish parliamentary delegation with Polish MPs. Poland, unique in their stance, has frequently questioned Turkey's interpretation of the Armenian genocide, and demanded Turkey to face the past atrocities, which has been something many Turkish officials feel deeply annoyed.

In 2007, the Polish-Turkish Chamber of Commerce (Polish: Polsko-Turecka Izba Gospodarcza, Turkish: Polonya-Türkiye Ticaret Odasi) was established. Its aim is to support the companies from both countries in mutual collaboration and trade and to strengthen the economic relations between Poland and Turkey. The main headquarters are located in Warsaw while in Turkey the organization has offices in Ankara and Istanbul.

Poland has expressed views that Russia is a threat to its national sovereignty and has accused Russia of meddling in foreign affairs in the Middle East and the former states of the Soviet Union. Thus, Poland has condemned Turkey's attempt of trying to get closer to Russia, such as buying the S-400 missile system as well as Turkey's deteriorating democracy. Nevertheless, Poland has supported Turkey's attempts to join the European Union.

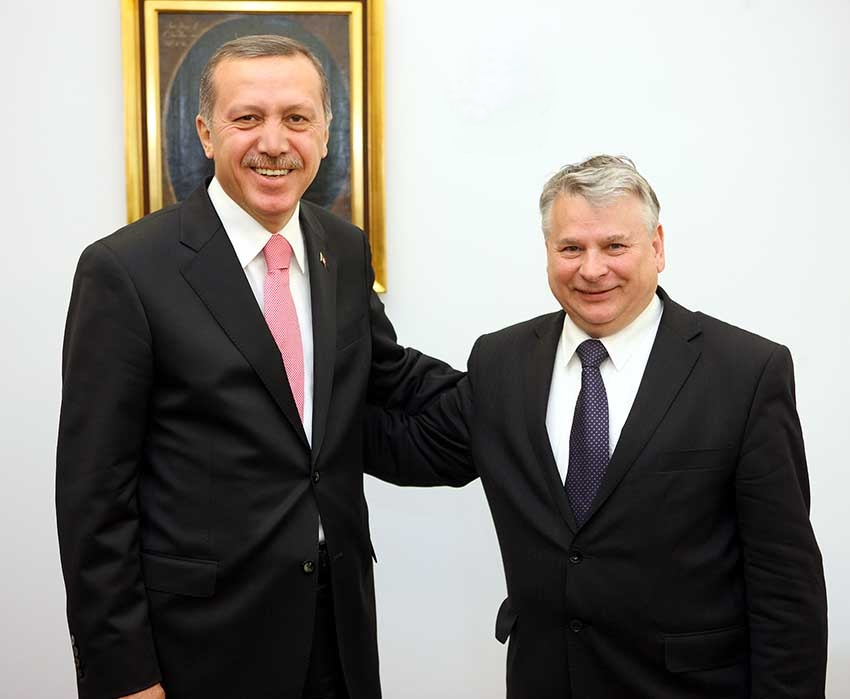
Recep Tayyip Erdoğan during his visit to Poland in 2009 with Bogdan Borusewicz.

In 2009, the Mutual Declaration On Economic Collaboration was signed by Poland and Turkey. Since the signing of the agreement regular meetings between Turkish and Polish entrepreneurs have been taking place in an effort to support the economic ties between the two nations.

April 18, 2010, the day of the state funeral of Lech and Maria Kaczyński, was declared a day of national mourning in Turkey to commemorate the 96 victims of the Smolensk air disaster, including Polish President Lech Kaczyński and his wife Maria Kaczyńska.

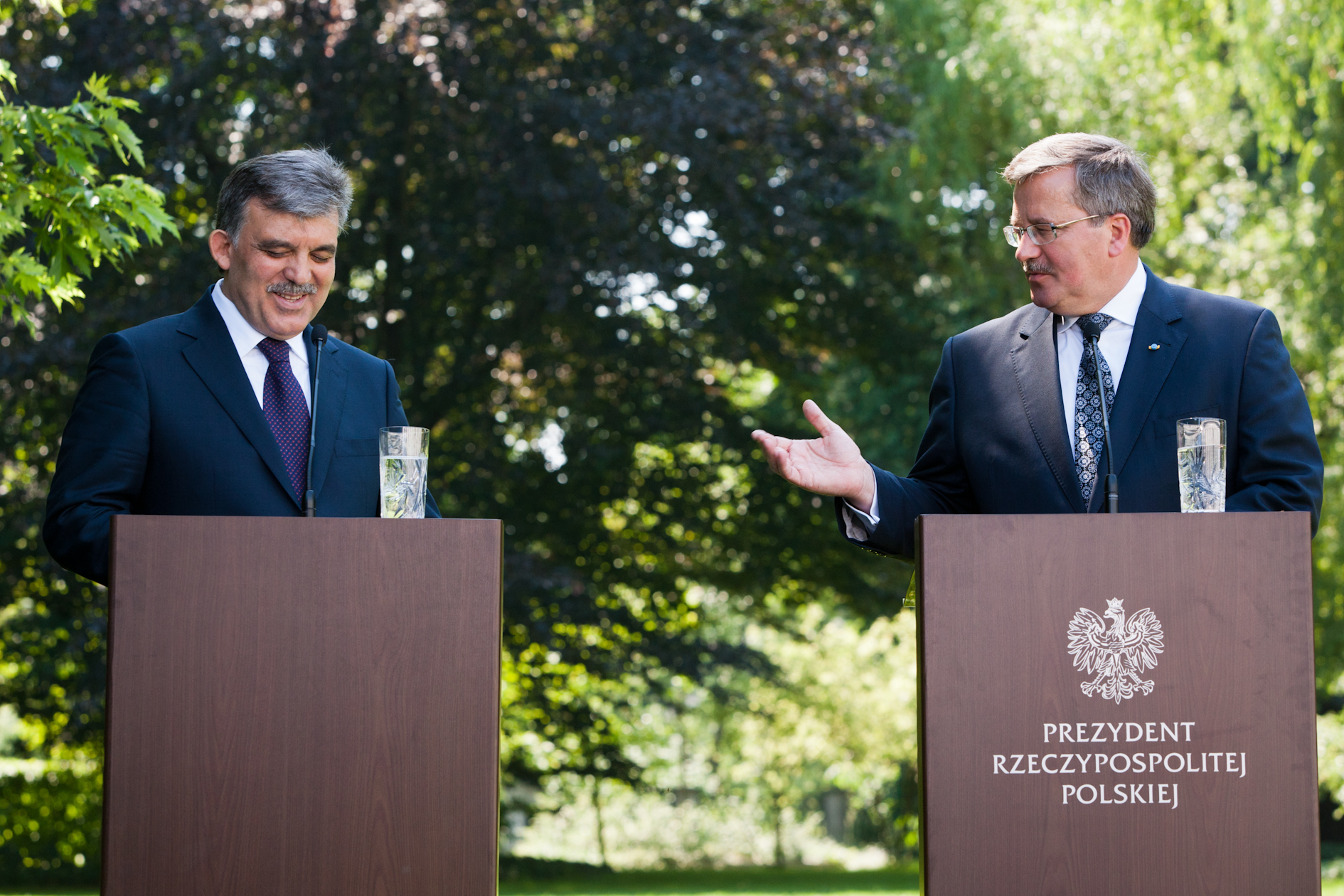
President of Turkey Abdullah Gul and President of Poland Bronisław Komorowski in 2011.

Since 2012, Poland, Turkey, and Romania have maintained regular contact within the Trilog format for close cooperation as the three largest countries on the eastern flank of NATO. Since 2021, a Polish military contingent has been stationed in Turkey as part of a NATO operation to help secure Turkey's borders.

Notable Turks with partial Polish ancestry include the poet and playwright Nâzım Hikmet, Ahmet Rüstem Bey, Fatoş Sezer, Hurrem Sultan, and the soprano opera singer Leyla Gencer.

In 2013, Poland and Turkey celebrated 600 years of diplomatic relations. In October 2017, Polish President Andrzej Duda met with Turkish President Recep Tayyip Erdoğan and supported Turkey's accession to the European Union. Poland and Turkey co-hosted the 2019 Women's European Volleyball Championship.

In April 2021, Turkish Foreign Minister Mevlüt Çavuşoğlu described his country's relations with Poland as a "strategic partnership", noting warm historic ties and military cooperation.

In August 2021, Poland sent firefighters to help extinguish the 2021 Turkey wildfires.

In October 2021, the head of the Ministry of National Defence Mariusz Błaszczak hosted Hulusi Akar, Turkey's Minister of Defence, in Warsaw. Topics discussed during the talks included bilateral military relations and cooperation within NATO as well as technical modernization and military cooperation including the purchase of drones from Turkey.

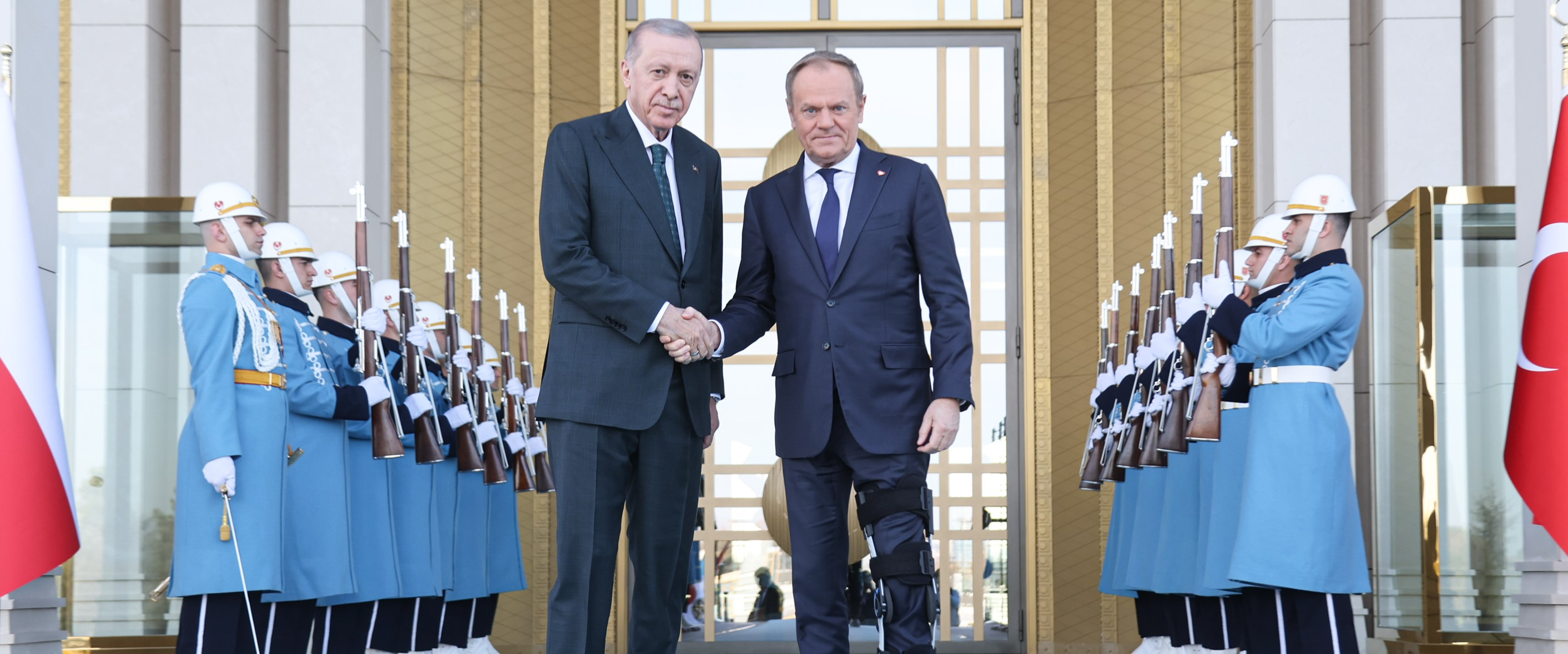
Turkish President Recep Tayyip Erdoğan with Polish Prime Minister Donald Tusk in Ankara, 12 March 2025

In November 2021, Polish Prime Minister Mateusz Morawiecki accused Turkey of assisting Belarus and Russia during the 2021–2022 Belarus–European Union border crisis. Turkey subsequently temporarily blocked flights to Belarus to ease the crisis and expressed support for the Polish authorities.

In April 2022, Turkey granted visa-free travel to Polish nationals.

In February 2023, Poland sent 178 rescuers and medics to Turkey to help the relief operation after the 2023 earthquake, as well as material aid, including medical equipment, medicines, power generators, field beds, etc. Various Polish charitable organizations, including the Polish Red Cross, Caritas Polska and Polish Humanitarian Action, organized fundraising and material aid for the earthquake victims.

Turkish students were the fourth largest group of foreign students in Poland in 2021 and 2022, and the third largest in 2023 and 2024, at the same time being the largest group from West Asia.

== Comparison ==
Official name	Republic of Poland	Republic of Turkey
Common name	Poland	Turkey
Coat of Arms/National Emblem	Poland	Emblem of Turkey
Population	38,383,000	85,279,553
Area	312,696 km^{2} (120,733 sq mi)	783,356 km^{2} (302,455 sq mi)
Population Density	123/km^{2} (318/sq mi)	111/km^{2} (287.5/sq mi)
Capital	Warsaw	Ankara
Largest City	Warsaw – 1,863,056 (3,100,844 Metro)	Istanbul – 15,907,951
Government	Unitary parliamentary constitutional republic	Unitary presidential constitutional republic
Legislature	Parliament of Poland	Grand National Assembly
Official language	Polish (de facto and de jure)	Turkish (de facto and de jure)
Current Leader	President Karol Nawrocki (2025–present); Prime Minister Donald Tusk (2023–present)	President Recep Tayyip Erdoğan (2014–present); Vice President Cevdet Yılmaz (2023–present)
Main religions	92.9% Christianity, 3.1% non-religious, 1.3% other, 2.7% unstated	92% Islam, 6% non-religious, 2% other
Ethnic groups	98% Polish, 2% other or unstated	70-75% Turks, 19% Kurds, 6-11% other
GDP (PPP)	$1,705 trillion, $45,343 per capita	$3,572 trillion, $41,412 per capita
GDP (nominal)	$748,887 billion, $19,912 per capita	$1,029 trillion $11,931 per capita
Military	Polish Armed Forces	Turkish Armed Forces
Military expenditures	$30.70 billion	$25.00 billion

== Resident diplomatic missions ==
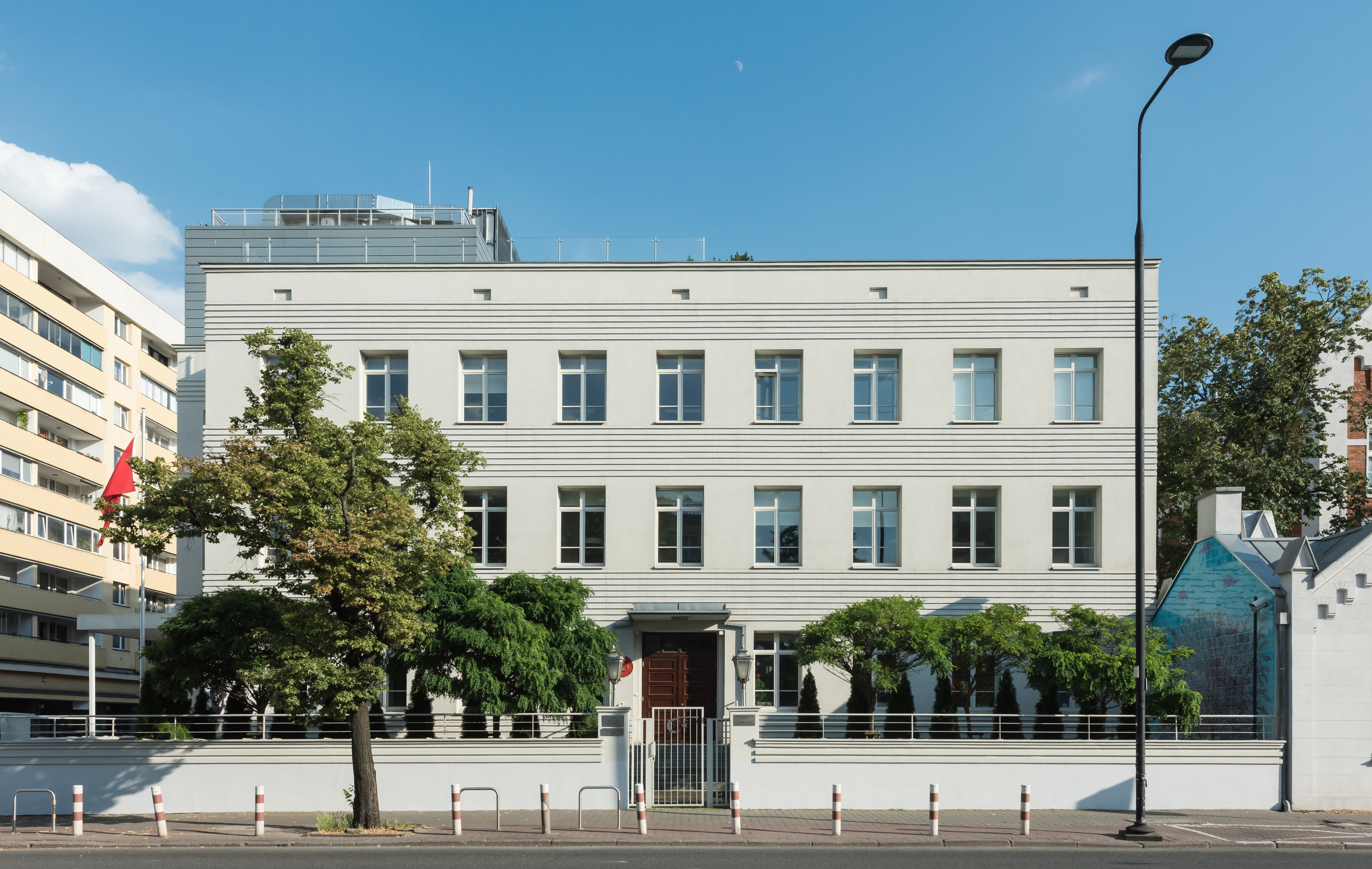
Embassy of Turkey in Warsaw

- Poland has an embassy in Ankara and a consulate-general in Istanbul.
- Turkey has an embassy in Warsaw.

== Honorary consulates ==
Poland also has an honorary consulates in Antalya, Bursa, Gaziantep and İzmir. Turkey also has an honorary consulates in Kraków, Łódź, Poznań and Wrocław.

== See also ==
- Poland–Turkey border
- Foreign relations of Poland
- Foreign relations of Turkey
- Turkey–European Union relations
- Turks in Poland
- Turks in Europe
