= Battle of Kızıl Tepe =

1877 battle of the Russo-Turkish War (1877–1878)

Coordinates: 40.6167°N 43.1000°E

Battle of Kizil-Tepe
- Part of the Russo-Turkish War (1877–1878)
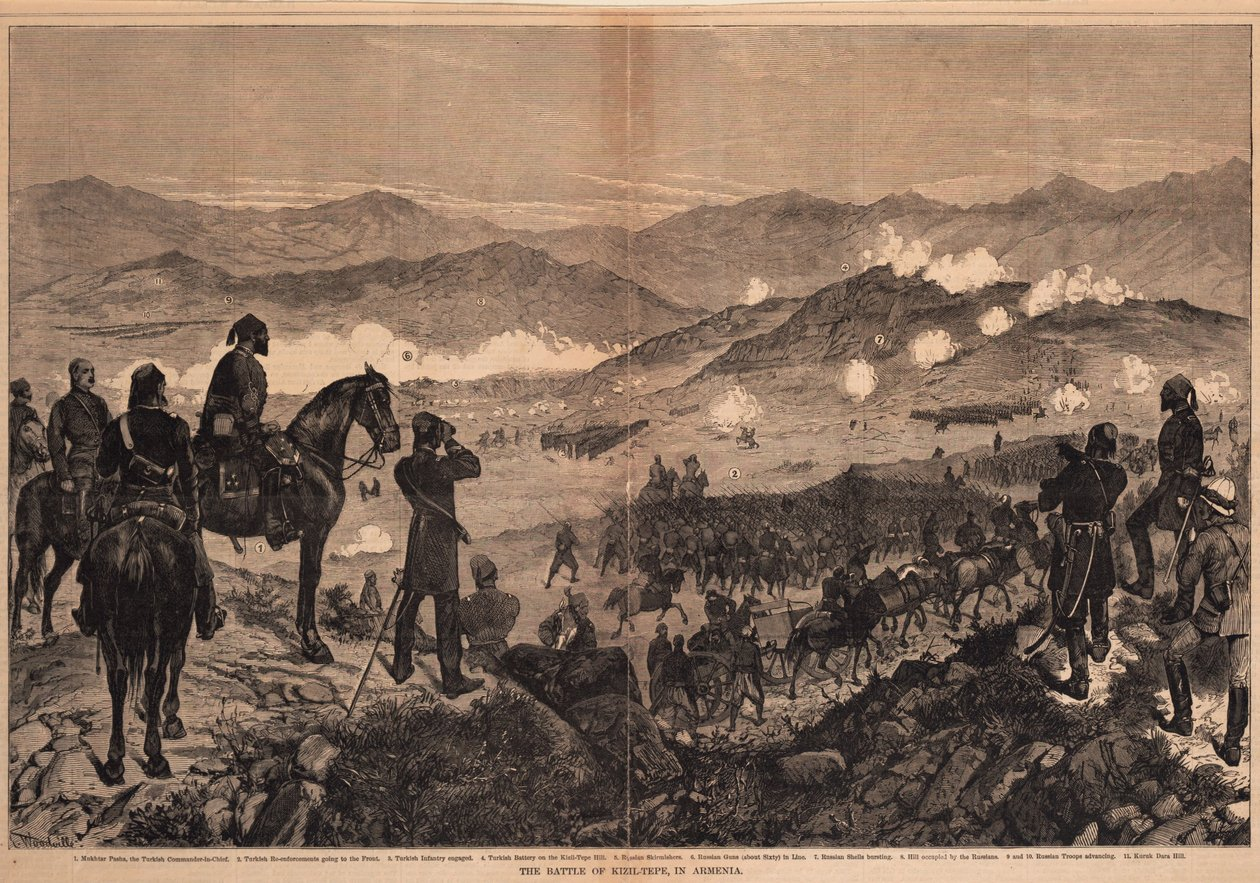
- The Battle of Kizil Tepe
Date	August 25, 1877
Location	near Kars
Result	Ottoman victory

Belligerents
Russian Empire	Ottoman Empire; (Poland) Polish Legion

Commanders and leaders
Mikhail Loris-Melikov; Zakhary Chavchavadze; Arshak Ter-Gukasov; Ferdinand von Sayn-Wittgenstein-Berleburg	Ahmed Muhtar Pasha

Strength
35,000 infantry 5,000 cossacks	35,000 infantry 12,000 cavalry 354 guns

Casualties and losses
Around 3,000 killed and wounded	430 killed 1,400 wounded

The Battle of Kizil-tepe (Turkish: Kızıltepe Muharebesi) was fought on August 25, 1877, between the Russian Empire and the Ottoman Empire. The Russian were attempting to besiege Kars. The Ottomans, vastly superior in numbers, successfully lifted the siege. The Ottoman forces were supported by the Polish legion in Turkey.
