= Coștangalia =

- Village
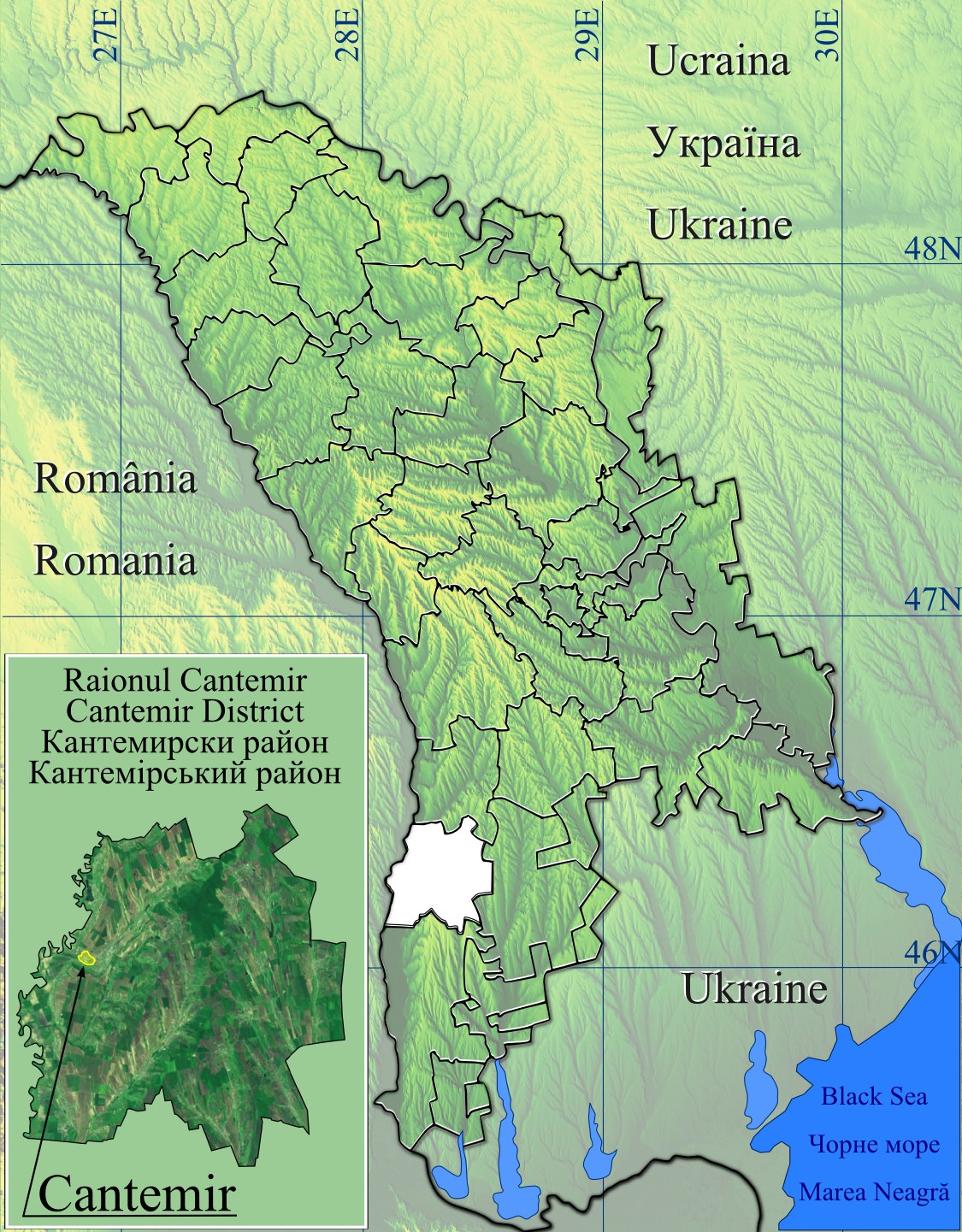
- Location within Cantemir
- Coordinates: 46°6′54″N 28°23′6″E
- Country: Moldova

Government
  - Mayor: Tudor Hantea (PDM)
- Elevation: 98 m (322 ft)

Population (2014 census)
  - Total: 880
- Time zone: UTC+2 (EET)
  - Summer (DST): UTC+3 (EEST)
- Postal code: MD-7322

Coștangalia is a village in Cantemir District, Moldova.

The battle of Coștangalia took place here on 15 July 1863.
