= Battle of Eski Zagra =

1877 battle of the Russo-Turkish War

- Part of the Russo-Turkish War (1877–1878)
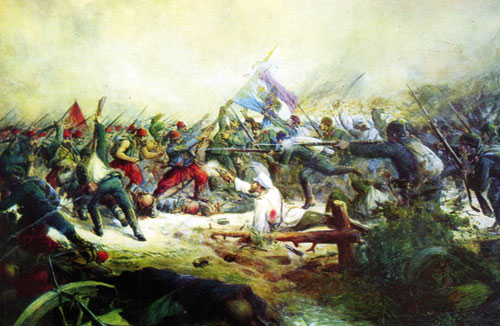
- Defending of the Samara flag (1909) by Pyotr Morozov
Date	19 July 1877
Location	Stara Zagora, Ottoman Empire; Present-day Bulgaria
Result	Ottoman victory
Territorial changes	Stara Zagora was captured and burned by the Ottoman troops; Russian troops have been driven back from central Bulgaria to the Balkan Mountains

Belligerents
Ottoman Empire	Russian Empire

Commanders and leaders
(Ottoman Empire) Süleyman Hüsnü Pasha (Ottoman Empire) (Poland) Józef Jagmin (DOW)	(Russian Empire) Iosif Gurko (Russian Empire) Nikolai Stoletov

Units involved
Süleyman Land Army	Advance squad: Parts of the Bulgarian Volunteer Corps

Strength
35,000 to 48,000: 17,500 to 24,000 engaged 8 cannons	4,500 to 5,000; 4 cannons

Casualties and losses
c. 200 to 1,500 casualties	567 casualties
- 14,000 to 20,000 Bulgarian civilians were killed

The Battle of Eski Zagra was a military engagement that took place in the city of Stara Zagora on 19 July 1877 during the Russo-Turkish War. As a result of a well-planned counteroffensive, the Ottoman troops were able to unexpectedly strike at the Russians and force them to retreat to the Balkan Mountains.

== Background ==
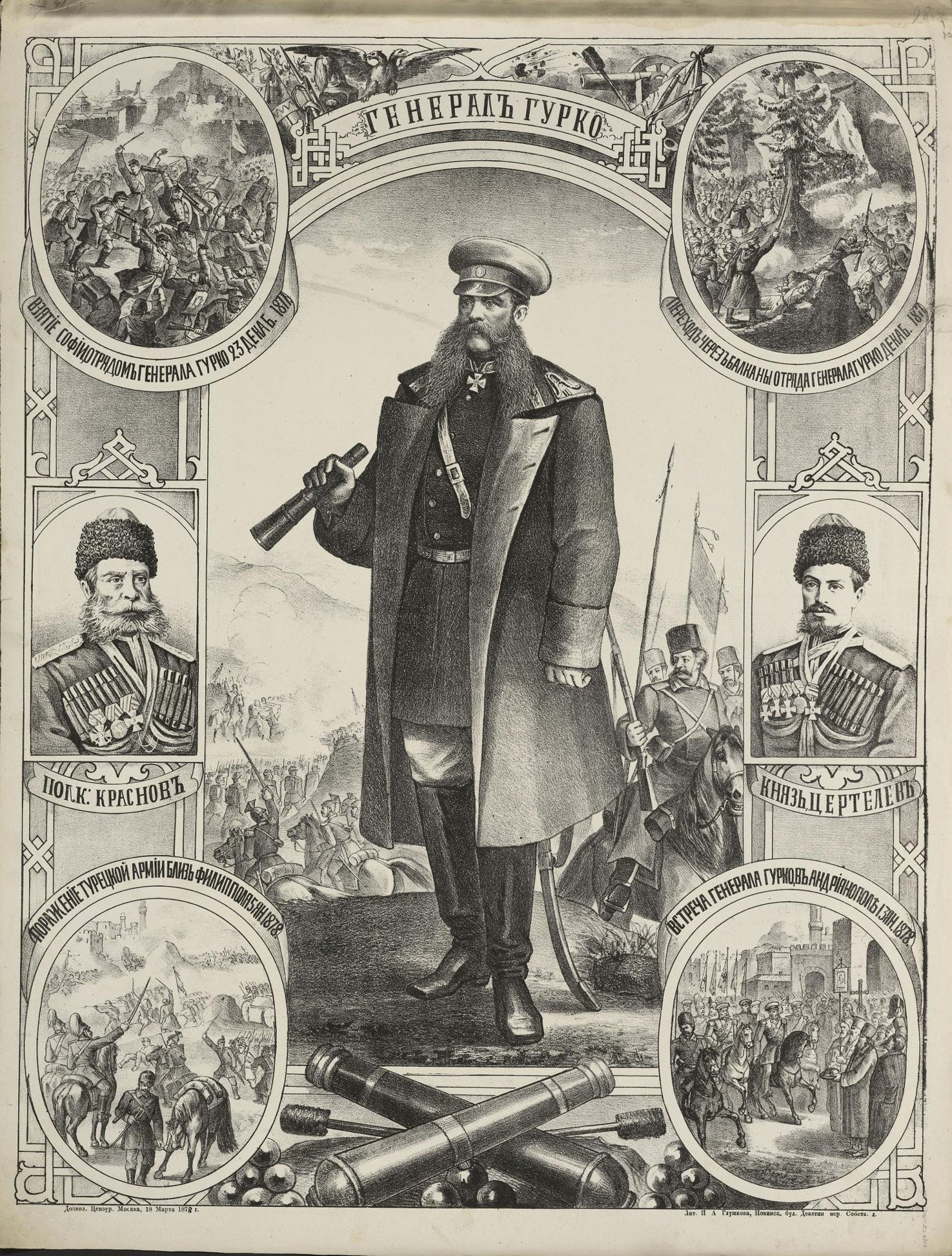
General Gurko during Russo-Turkish War

Initially, the Advance Squad offensive was successful. General Gurko's units, encountering no resistance, captured trophies and prisoners, and on June 25 they took the city of Veliko Tarnovo, the ancient capital of Bulgaria. Then he successfully passed through the mountain passes of the Balkan mountains and began to develop an offensive further - on Nova Zagora and Stara Zagora, which covered the flanks of the Danube army. At that time, Suleiman Pasha's army arrived from Montenegro and almost immediately launched an offensive in a place unknown to the Russians.

=== Sizes of the armies ===
Since the Russians did not know about the Ottomans' plans, only a small part of the entire advanced detachment remained in Stara Zagora, its number varies from 4,500 to 5,000, which was several times less than that of the Turks. Suleiman Pasha's army was a formidable force: its size, according to Russian military historians, ranged from 35,000 to 40,000, and according to Bulgarian data - 48,000, with a double advantage in artillery. But only half were engaged.

== Battle ==
At about 8 a.m., the Turks appeared right in front of the city, which caused a commotion in the defenders' camp. The Turks began shelling the city, which caused serious damage, and a fire even broke out somewhere. However, the defenders, waiting for reinforcements, did not think to retreat from the city. The main forces of the Gurko detachment actually began a forced march to help the city, but they were attacked by forces under the command of Mehmed Rauf Pasha bin Abdi Pasha. A fierce battle began there. The Russians forced the Turks to retreat, but they themselves did not have time to help the city, where everything had already been decided at that time.

=== Kalitin's death ===
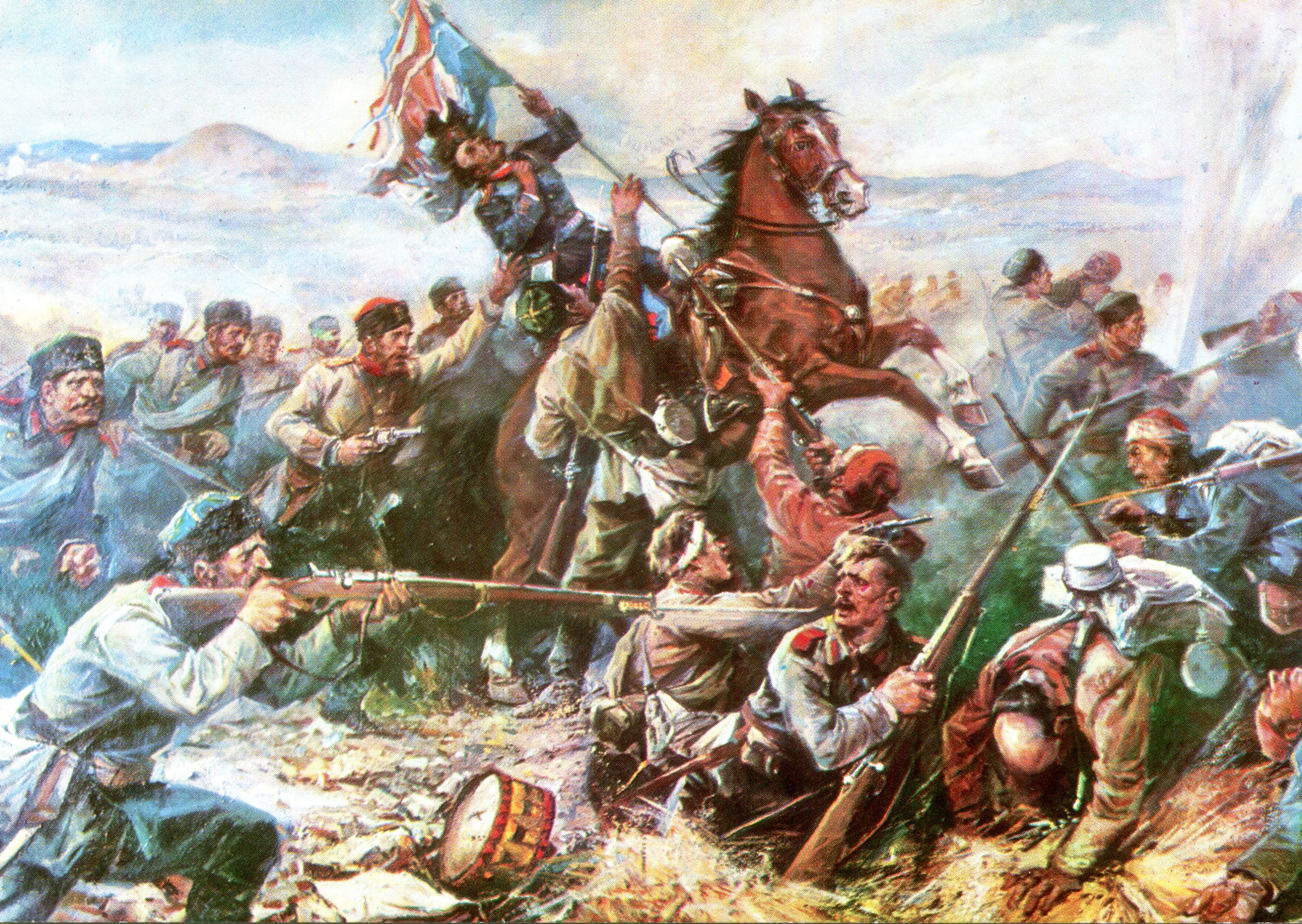
Death of colonel Kalitin by an unknown author

During the battle, when a strong Turkish column gathered against the 3rd company, Pavel Kalitin, having asked Stoletov for permission to attack the Turks, ordered to ask for reinforcements. The officers and soldiers went, as if to a feast, cheerful and to the sounds of folk songs, they rushed at the Turks. The attack was so unexpected and swift that the Turks retreated, but their strong reserve and deadly artillery fire forced the militia to retreat. During the second attack, in which this company was also supported by the 1st, Pavel Kalitin seeing that the standard-bearer of the 3rd company Marchenko fell dead and lost their Samara flag, immediately jumped to the ground, grabbed the banner, jumped back on his horse, rode out in front of the formation of his company with the banner raised high and shouted loudly: “Children, our banner is with us. Forward after it! After me!” The millitants, filling the air with cries of "hurrah", rushed to run. During this Kalytin was killed. A non-commissioned officer tore the flag from his hands, and the tree broke in the middle, but, having jumped with it for two steps, he fell lifeless. Another non-commissioned officer rushed down, grabbed him by the throat, and he too was on the spot. At this time, a crowd of Turks rushed to the flag spread on the ground, seized it and rushed to run. Those of the militiamen who were nearby, with loaded rifles, drawn sabers and shouting “Hurray!” and “For Bulgaria,” rushed like a whirlwind after the standard-bearer: they killed, cut, stabbed with bayonets, beat with rifle butts, until they approached him and, after a fierce fight in which several people fell on both sides, the militiamen seized the banner.

=== Retreat ===
Unable to withstand the onslaught of the Turkish forces, the Bulgarians and Russians began to retreat, trying to withdraw part of the population. The Turks slowly pursued them, as most of the troops devoted themselves to looting the city. The retreating troops were periodically ambushed, which caused them to suffer losses, as a result, some of them fled, mixing with the population. At that time, Gurko approached the city, but he was too late, and he also became involved in the retreat, only he conducted it in perfect order.

== Aftermath ==
After the capture of the city, the infamous massacre took place there, the whole city was destroyed Population losses are estimated from 14,000 to 20,000. From a military point of view, the Russians were forced to retreat back into the mountain passes, which significantly delayed the course of hostilities. Nevertheless, despite the victory, the Ottomans did not develop further than this. The Russians lost 576 people. and the Turks, according to their data, only 200. However, the Russians estimate Turkish damage at 1,500.
