= Józef Jagmin =

Polish nobleman

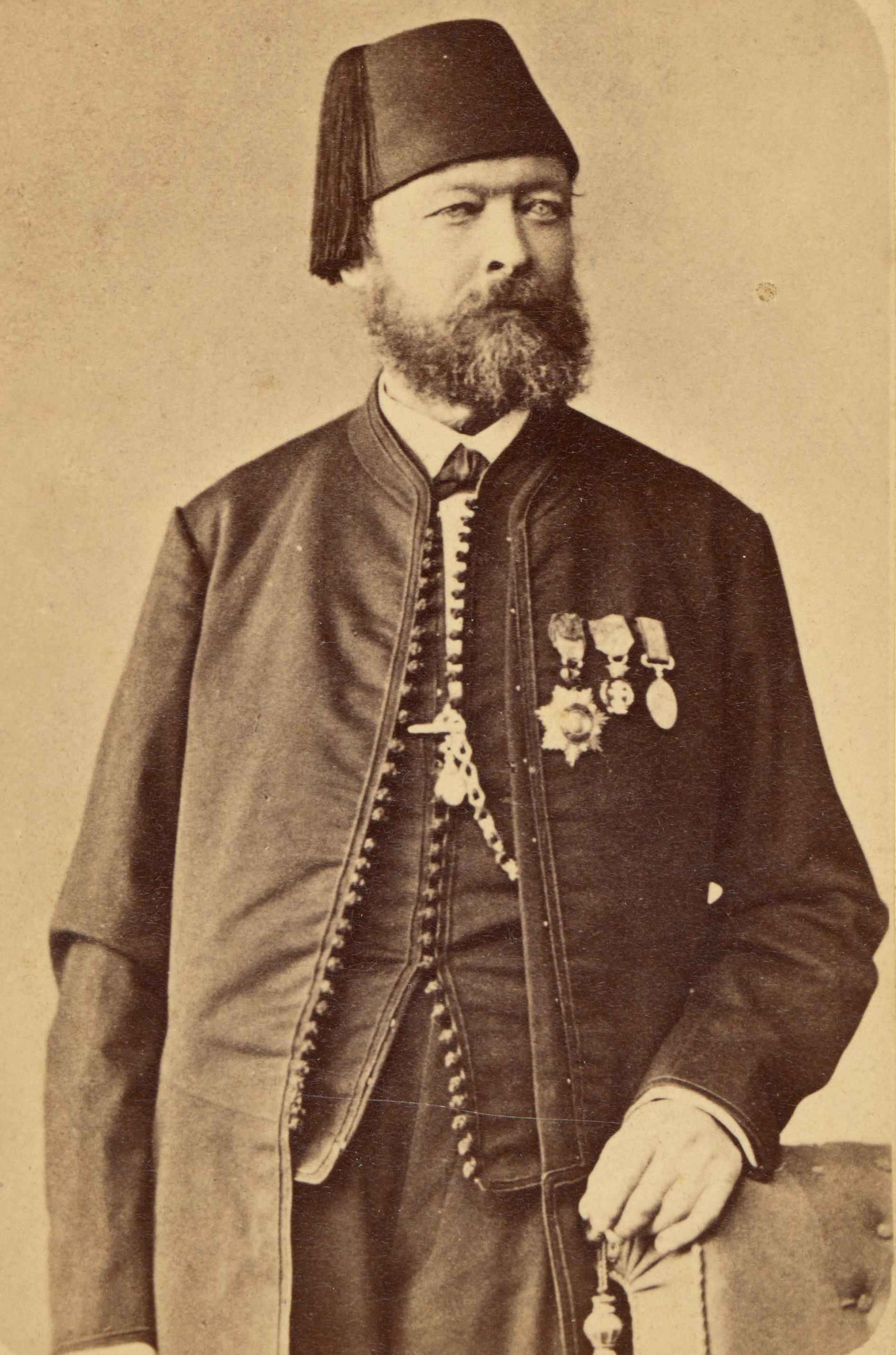
Józef Jagmin

Józef Jagmin (c. 1810 – 31 September 1877 in Shumen) was a Polish officer. He was born to a noble Samogitian family.

== Military career ==
Józef Jagmin took part in the November Uprising in Lithuania under the command of General Henryk Dembiński, and then in Warsaw, after its collapse he emigrated to France. In August 1848, he joined the Polish Legions in Hungary under General Józef Wysocki in the Hungarian army and fought in the Hungarian Uprising, on the battles of Szolnok and Hatvan. For his service he was awarded the Hungarian insurgent Order of Merit (3rd class). After the defeat of the uprising, in August 1849 he managed to get to Turkey, where he lived in Constantinople. As a major, he served in the Polish regiment of the Sultan Cossacks of General Władysław Zamoyski against Russia during the Crimean War in 1853–1856, then he returned to France. In 1863 he took part in the January Uprising as the commander of the branch in the Lublin region.

To get to Poland, he joined the unit under Zygmunt Miłkowski and fought against Romania at the Battle of Coștangalia in 15 July 1863, as the Romanians did not want to let the Polish unit to return to Poland. After the defeat of the uprising, he made his way to Turkey. In the next Russo-Turkish War in 1877 as a colonel (according to other sources, major), He was the founder and commander of Polish Legion (with a force of about 65 people) operating within the Turkish army. He died as a result of wounds sustained in the Battle of Eski Zagra in Bulgaria (some sources incorrectly state Kizlar in the Caucasus).
