= Turkophilia =

Affinity towards the Turkish people

Turkophilia (Turkish: Türkofili) is the feeling or expression of interest in, respect for, and appreciation of Turks on the part of a non-Turk. More specifically, a Turkophile is someone who has a strongly positive predisposition or sympathy towards Turkey and the Turkish people, with an admiration for their language and literature, culture (art, music, cuisine, etc.), history, or government. The phenomenon may also include a broader appreciation of the Turkic peoples, of whom the Turkish people are a part. The opposite sentiment is known as Turkophobia.

== Early modern period ==
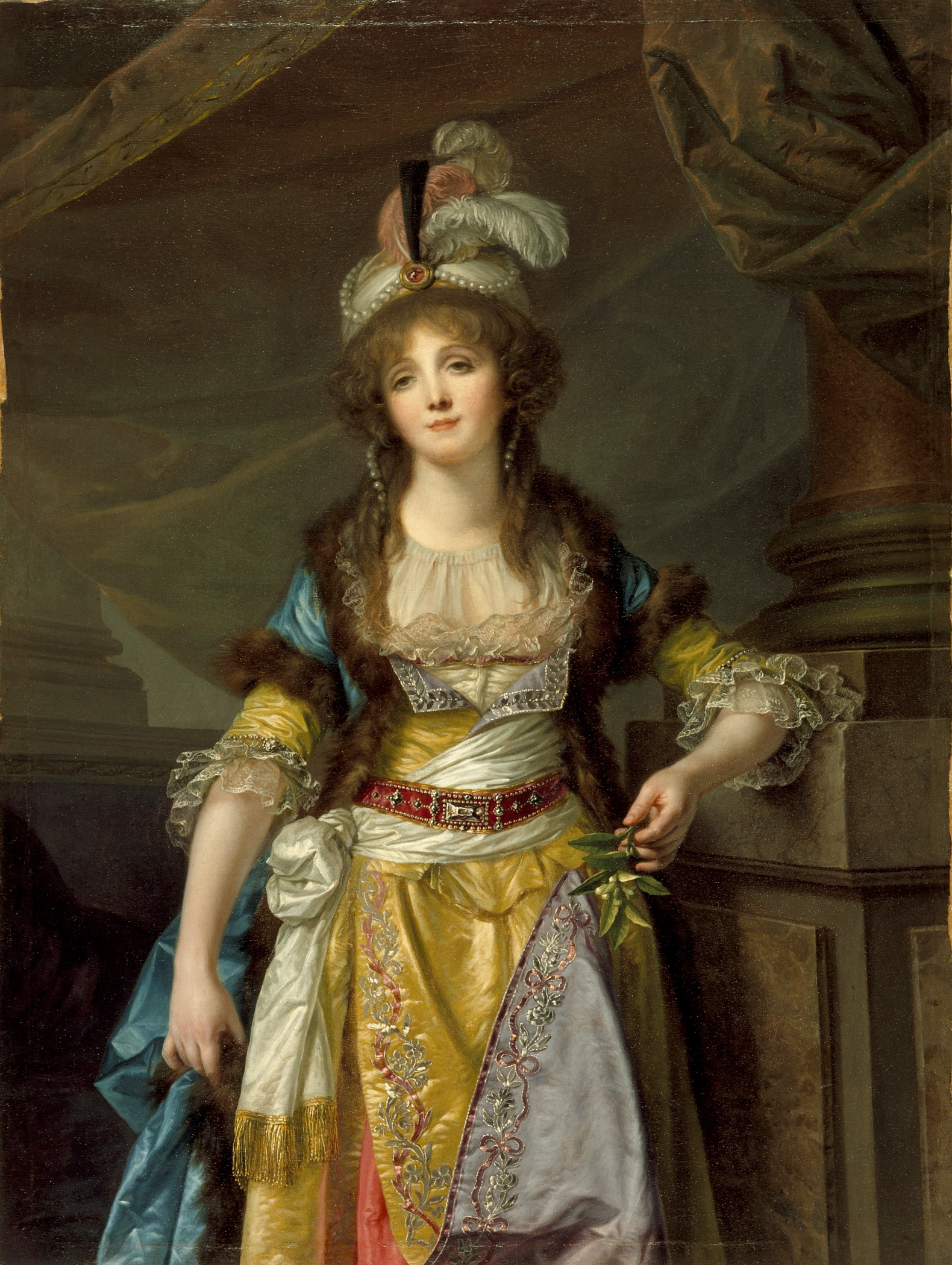
Portrait of a Lady in Turkish Fancy Dress by Jean-Baptiste Greuze (c. 1790)

In Western discourse, the term "Turcophile" is often linked to the cultural phenomenon of Turquerie, reflecting the broader European admiration for the customs, aesthetics, and splendor of the Ottoman Empire in the 17th and 18th centuries. Although these concepts have distinct historical foundations, they both reflect the influence and presence of Turkish culture, traditions, and artistic heritage within the European context.

== Notable Turkophiles ==
- Marmaduke Pickthall, English novelist and Islamic scholar
- Rowland Allanson-Winn, 5th Baron Headley, Irish peer
- Jean-Étienne Liotard, Swiss painter, art connoisseur and dealer
- David Urquhart, Scottish diplomat, writer and politician
- Ármin Vámbéry, Hungarian Turkologist and traveller
- Ernst Jäckh, German author
- Pierre Loti, French naval officer and novelist
- Juanito, French singer
- Thadée Gasztowtt, Polish diplomat, revolutionary, historian, and journalist of noble Lithuanian descent
- Lev Gumilyov, Soviet historian, ethnologist and anthropologist
- Dimitrie Ralet, Moldavian politician and writer
- Eric Adams, former Mayor of New York City

== See also ==
- Turquerie
- Turkology
- Turanism
