= Zygmunt Miłkowski =

Polish writer and politician (1824–1915)

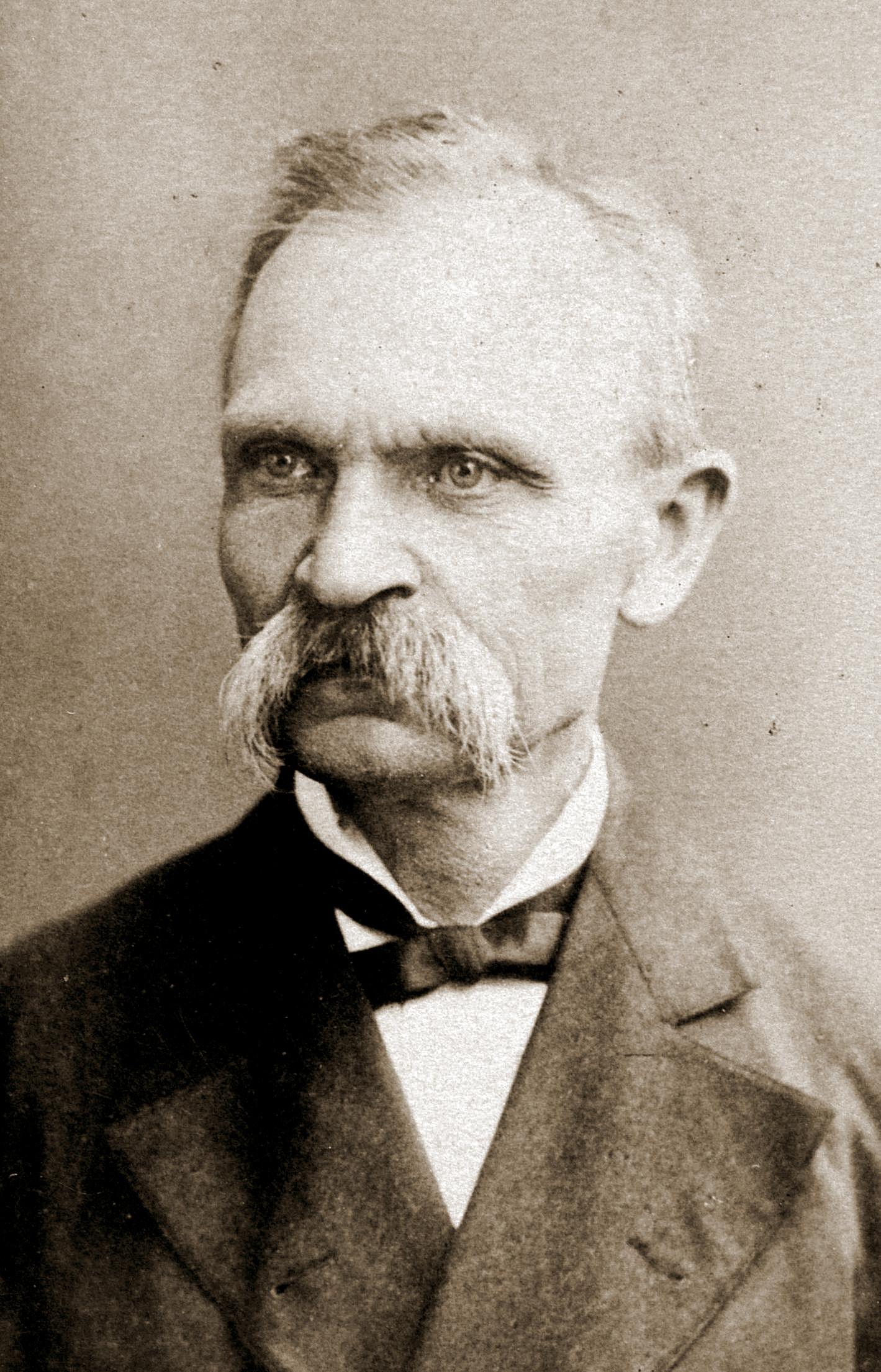
- Born: 23 March 1824; Sărăței, Baltsky Uyezd, Podolia Governorate, Russian Empire (now Moldova)
- Died: 11 January 1915 (aged 90); Lausanne, Switzerland
- Occupations: romantic writer and politician
- Known for: his struggle for independence of Poland and leadership of Polish Union

Zygmunt Miłkowski, pseudonym Teodor Tomasz Jeż (23 March 1824 in Sărăței, Podolia Governorate, Russian Empire – 11 January 1915 in Lausanne, Switzerland) was a Polish romantic writer and politician who struggled for independence of Poland as leader of Polish Union (Polish: Liga Polska). In 1869 he became a member of the Serbian Learned Society, which in 1892 merged into the Serbian Academy of Sciences and Arts.

== Selected works ==
- Wasyl Hołub
- Handzia Zahornicka
- Historia o pra-pra-prawnuku
- Hryhor Serdeczny
- Szandor Kowacz
- Ci i tamci
- Asan
- Uskoki
- Narzeczona Harambaszy
- Niezaradni (1884)
- Ofiary 1874
- Dahijszczyzna
- Rotułowicze
- W zaraniu
- Dersław Z Rytwian
- Za króla Olbrachta
- Nauczycielka
- Emancypowana
- Pamiętniki starającego się
- Od kolebki przez życie
- Nad rzekami Babilonu
- Rycerz chrześcijański 1889, A novel about Skanderbeg
