= The deputy from Lehistan has not arrived yet =

Line from an urban legend in Poland

"The deputy from Lehistan has not arrived yet" (Polish: poseł Lechistanu jeszcze nie przybył, Turkish: Lehistan sefiri yoldadır) is a line from an urban legend in Poland, supposedly announced during diplomatic corps being received by the sultan of the Ottoman Empire, as a response to chief of protocol supposedly asking "Where is the deputy from Lehistan?". It is said to be done as a protest to the partition of Polish–Lithuanian Commonwealth in 1795. The story is widely questioned by historians as no record of such habit has been found, and originated from the fact that the Ottoman Empire did not recognize the partition of the Polish–Lithuanian Commonwealth. The oldest known written records of the story come from the 1930s and 1940s, and are attributed to Michał Sokolnicki, an ambassador of Poland to Turkey, who used to tell it during diplomatic meetings.

== History ==
According to the story, after the Partitions of Poland in 1795, whenever the sultan of the Ottoman Empire had received the diplomatic corps, there always had been left one empty chair reserved from the representative from Polish–Lithuanian Commonwealth. While doing so, the chief of protocol would ask ostentatiously "Where is the deputy from Lehistan?", receiving the reply: "Your Excellency, the deputy of Lehistan could not make it because of vital impediments", or, according to other versions of the tale, "the deputy from Lehistan hasn't arrived yet". It would be done as a protest against the partition of the Polish–Lithuanian Commonwealth between the Kingdom of Prussia, Russian Empire, and Habsburg monarchy, that took place in 1795. The name Lehistan (Land of Lechites), is an archaic word for Poland in Turkish, which in modern language is known as Polonya.

The tale originates from the fact that, following the partitions of Poland, the Ottoman Empire, along with Qajar Iran, were the only major countries that did not recognize the final partition of Polish–Lithuanian Commonwealth. Other sources state that the Ottoman Empire was the only country which did not recognize the partitions.

The first written record of this story comes from Michał Sokolnicki, who between 1936 and 1945 was an ambassador of Poland in Turkey. He learned the story from Ali Fuat Cebesoy, a Turkish army officer and politician, who was acquainted with the Istanbul Polish community. Cebesoy claimed that the habit continued until the end of the sultanate and that he witnessed it in person as a young officer during the reign of Sultan Abdul Hamid II. The accuracy of this account is widely questioned by historians, as no record of such a habit from the early nineteenth century has been found.

== Bibliography ==
- Sokolnicki, Michał: Polityka Piłsudskiego a Turcja, vol. 6. Niepodległość. London: Wydawn. Instytutu Józefa Piłsudskiego Poświęconego Badaniu Najnowszej Historii Polski, 1958.
