= Polish Legion in Turkey =

Polish-led military formation in Ottoman service during the Russo-Turkish War

- Legion Polski w Turcji; Türkiye'deki Polonya Lejyonu
- Active: June 1877 – November 1877
- Country: Ottoman Empire
- Allegiance: (Ottoman Empire) Ottoman Army
- Size: c. 150–200
- Campaigns: Russo-Turkish War (1877–1878)

Commanders
- Commanders: (Ottoman Empire) (Poland) Józef Jagmin (DOW)

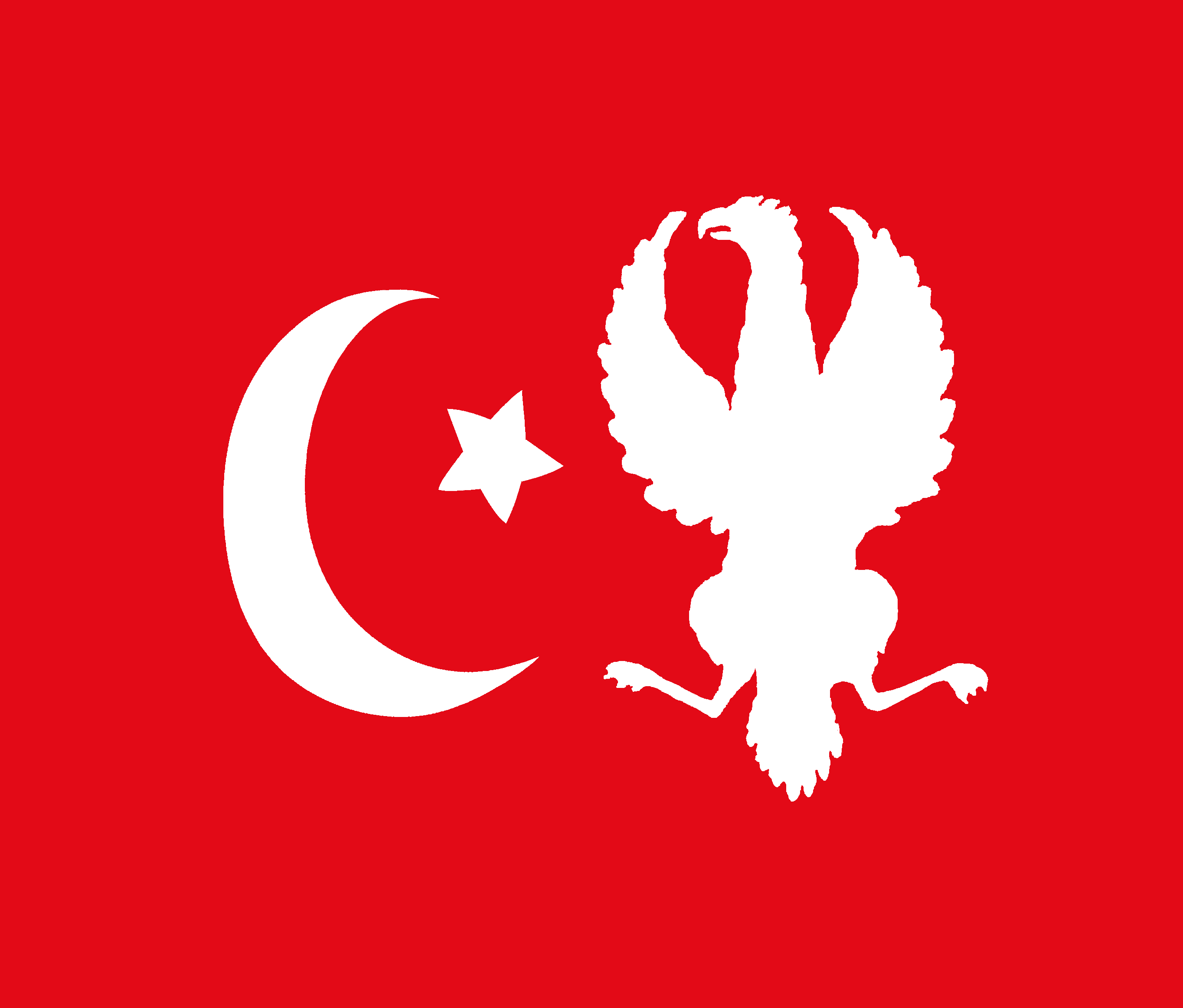
Banner of the legion

The Polish Legion in Turkey (Polish: Legion Polski w Turcji, Turkish: Türkiye'deki Polonya Lejyonu) was a military force formed in Istanbul by emigrants from Partitioned Poland to fight with the Ottoman Army in the Russo-Turkish War (1877–1878) against the Russian Empire.

Despite attempts to recruit a larger force, the legion numbered only around 200 volunteers, mainly Polish Jews, and it was extremely unpopular.

== Formation and service ==
The legion was intended to play a moral and diplomatic role: diplomatically, it was to represent Polish nationalism, whilst morally, it was to express a Christian character by refraining from killing fellow Christians and even preventing such killings by the Turks, which were considered likely. This vision failed, as the legion was not allowed to demonstrate any Christian emblems and instead was forced to depict a crescent moon, a star and a white eagle.

The legion was divided into two branches: European and Asian. The Asian division fought on the Caucasus. The European branch, under the command of Józef Jagmin, was too small to operate independently and was incorporated into an Ottoman formation. It first saw combat at the Battle of Kızıl Tepe, where Jagmin was killed. It was disbanded in November 1877.

== Composition ==
The legion was not entirely Polish in composition. A June 1877 report placed its strength at about 150 men, including 60 Polish Jews, 56 Polish Catholics, with the rest being a mix of other nationalities.

== Reception ==
The legion was very unpopular. The greater number of Poles opposed its formation. Many Polish newspapers, including Czas and newspapers in the Prussian partition, wrote articles condemning it. Opposition was also found among Polish Catholic conservatives. The ultramontane and Catholic-conservative Przegląd Lwowski criticized attempts to organize Polish formations fighting alongside the Ottomans.

Some support existed, but it was also anti-Ottoman in essence. Cyprian Norwid supported the creation of an independent Polish and Christian formation, but envisaged it protecting Christians in the likely event of killings by Ottoman forces. A Polish officer already serving in the Ottoman Army similarly described the purpose of the Polish military presence in Turkey as solely anti-Russian and expressed satisfaction that his unit had not been used against the Balkan Christians. A Polish correspondent writing from Geneva in June 1877 likewise defended the creation of the legion against Russia, but argued against encouraging Poles to stand "on the side of Turkey". He described the legion as a "necessary evil" and wrote that the fewer Poles who participated, the better.

In 1879, the correspondent of Kurier Poznański wrote that the legion received condemnation in Poland, because, although the public was anti-Russian, it was also pro-Balkan Christian, and the war concerned the fate of the latter. Polish historian Stefan Kieniewicz wrote that the creation of the legion was not an expression of Polish "national will", noting that most Poles, including émigrés, supported Balkan Christians against the Turks.

Contrary to the roughly 200 volunteers amassed by the legion, several tens of thousands of Polish subjects of the Russian Empire took part in the war against the Ottomans in the Imperial Russian Army.

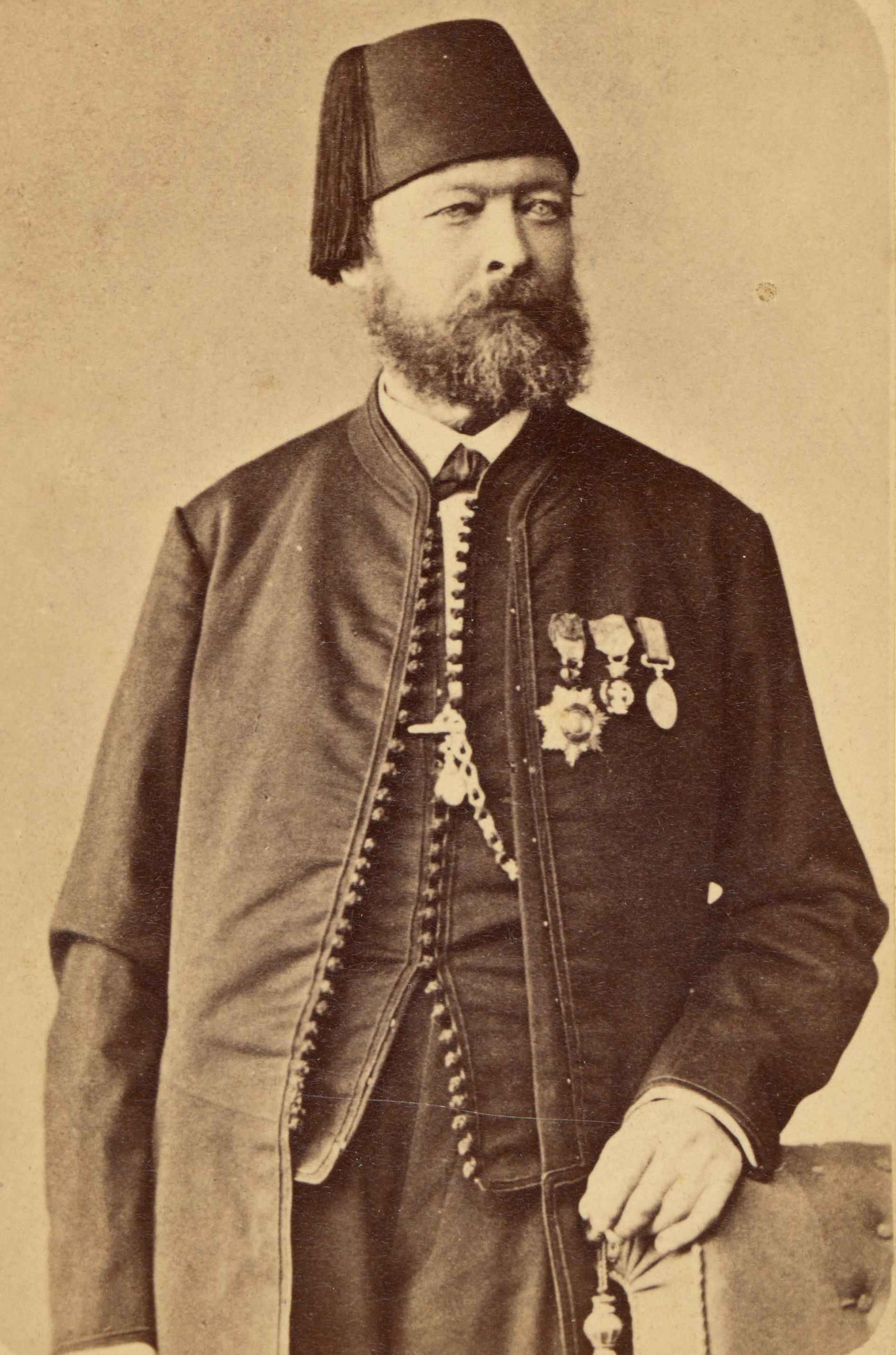
Józef Jagmin, commander of the legion

== See also ==
- Adam Mickiewicz
- Mustafa Celalettin Pasha
- Józef Bem
- Antoni Aleksander Iliński
- Ahmet Rüstem Bey
- Władysław Stanisław Zamoyski
- Ludomił Rayski
- Wojciech Bobowski
- Marian Langiewicz
- Stanisław Julian Ignacy Ostroróg
- Stanisław Julian Ostroróg
- Leon Walerian Ostroróg
- Stanislas Ostroróg
- Ibrahim Bey
