= Darüşşafaka =

Darüşşafaka, meaning "home of compassion" in Ottoman Turkish, may refer to:

- Darüşşafaka Society, a Turkish educational association founded to train apprentices
  - Darüşşafaka High School, a school in Maslak, Istanbul, Turkey
- Darüşşafaka Basketbol, a professional basketball club based in İstanbul
- Darüşşafaka (Istanbul Metro), a railway station in Istanbul
- Darüşşafaka, a neighbourhood in the Sarıyer district of Istanbul.
