= Darüşşafaka High School =

- Darüşşafaka Eğitim Kurumları
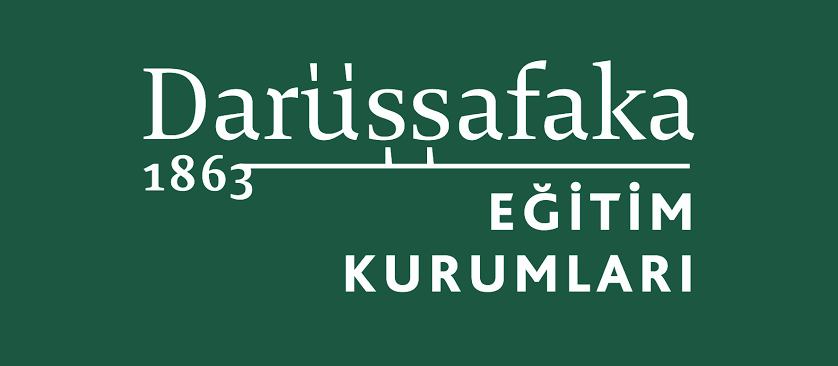

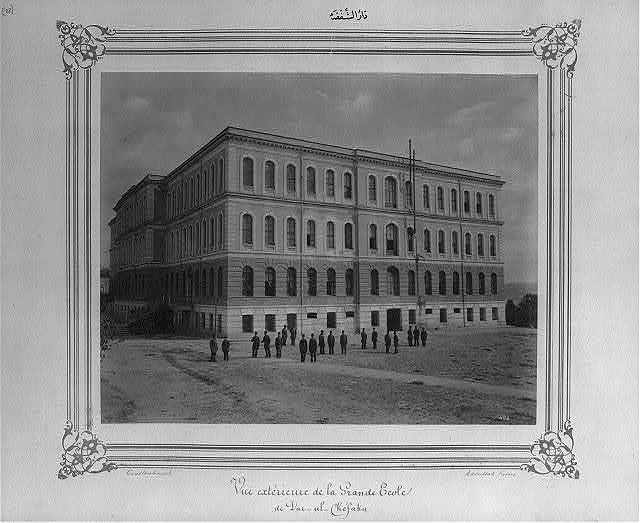
- Darüşşafaka building in Fatih before moving to Sarıyer

Location
- Darüşşafaka Cad. No.14 Maslak, Sarıyer 34457; Istanbul 34457; Turkey
- 41°7′34.09″N 29°1′39.53″E

Information
- Funding type: Donation-based
- Motto: Eğitimde Fırsat Eşitliği (Equal Opportunity in Education)
- Religious affiliation: Islam
- Established: 1863; 163 years ago Cemiyet-i Tedrisiye-i İslamiye; 1865; 161 years ago Darüşşafaka İdadisi
- Founders: Yusuf Ziya Pasha, Gazi Ahmed Muhtar Paşa, Hüseyin Tevfik Pasha, Ahmed Esad Pasha and Ali Naki Efendi
- Age range: 11-18
- Enrollment: ≈125
- Capacity: ≈1000
- Average class size: ≈24
- Language: Turkish, English, German (Mandatory)
- Hours in school day: 7-8 hours
- Colors: Green, white, black
- Slogan: Olmassada Olur
- Song: "Darüşşafaka Marşı"
- Sports: Basketball
- Mascot: Selim; Dodo the Panther (see Darussafaka SK)
- Nickname: Daçka
- Teams: Sultans of Türkiye #2905 (robot team)
- Newspaper: Darüşşafaka Haberler
- Website: darussafaka.org

Darüşşafaka High School (Turkish: Darüşşafaka Eğitim Kurumları) is a boarding, coeducational school in Maslak, Istanbul, Turkey, established in 1863. It was founded by the Darüşşafaka Society, recognized as Turkey's first civil society organization in the field of education. The institution provides a nine-year, fully-funded education to students who have lost one or both parents and lack financial means, selected through an entrance exam.

The origins of the school trace back to the Cemiyet-i Tedrisiye-i İslamiye (English: Islamic Education Society), which was established on March 30, 1863, by decree of Sultan Abdülaziz. Initially, the society focused on training apprentices in Istanbul's Grand Bazaar. Following the success of this initiative, its educational scope was expanded, and the school began operating in a newly constructed building in the Fatih district in 1873.

Throughout its history, Darüşşafaka has adapted its curriculum to meet contemporary educational needs, at times serving as an institution for training telegraph engineers and teachers. Between 1873 and 1884, graduates were considered equivalent to those with higher education degrees. Today, the school operates on its Maslak campus, with its high school section officially named Özel Darüşşafaka Lisesi and holding college-preparatory status.
