= Darüşşafaka Society =

- Darüşşafaka Cemiyeti
- Logo of the Darüşşafaka Society

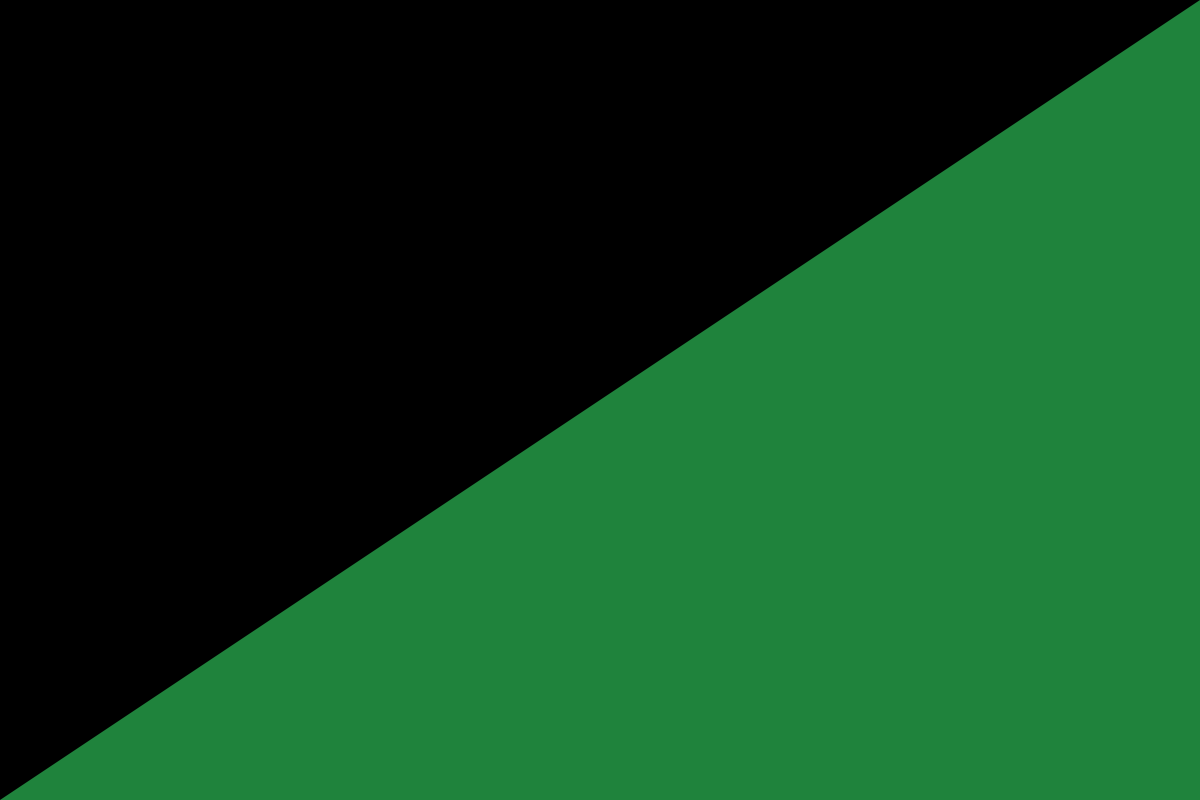
- Flag of the Darüşşafaka Society (1863?-)

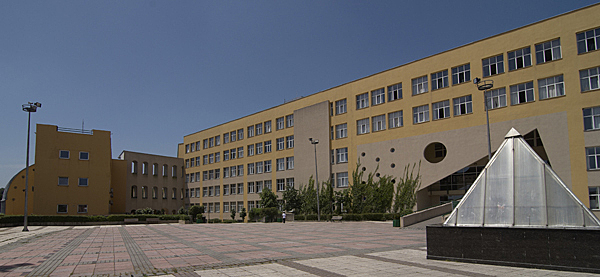
- Darüşşafaka Schools, a property of the Darüşşafaka Society
- Formation: March 30, 1863; 163 years ago
- Founder: Yusuf Ziya Pasha, Gazi Ahmed Muhtar Paşa, Hüseyin Tevfik Pasha, Ahmed Esad Pasha and Ali Naki Efendi
- Type: Nonprofit
- Headquarters: Darüşşafaka Mah. Darüşşafaka Cad. No:5/9 Maslak 34457 Sarıyer / İSTANBUL
- Services: Darussafaka Schools, Darüşşafaka Residences, Sait Faik Abasıyanık Museum, Darüşşafaka Ömran and Yahya Hamuluoğlu Physical Therapy and Rehabilitation Center
- Fields: Robotics
- Official language: Turkish, English, German
- Chairman: Oğuz Güleç
- Students: ≈1000 (2025)
- Website: https://www.darussafaka.org/
- Formerly called: Cemiyet-i Tedrisiye-i İslamiye (Society for Islamic Education)

The Darüşşafaka Society (Turkish: Darüşşafaka Cemiyeti) is one of Turkey's oldest and most prominent non-governmental organizations dedicated to education. Established in 1863, the society has played a significant role in providing quality education to underprivileged children, particularly orphans and those from low-income families. Over its long history, Darüşşafaka has evolved into a well-respected institution, known for its contributions to Turkish education and its commitment to social equity.

== History ==
=== 19th century ===
The Darüşşafaka Society was founded on March 30, 1863, under the name Cemiyet-i Tedrisiye-i İslamiye (Society for Islamic Education) by a group of Ottoman intellectuals and statesmen, including Yusuf Ziya Pasha, Gazi Ahmed Muhtar Paşa, Hüseyin Tevfik Pasha, Ahmed Esad Pasha and Ali Naki Efendi. The society received official recognition through a decree (ferman) issued by Sultan Abdülaziz. Its primary mission was to support the education of impoverished and disadvantaged members of society, particularly focusing on apprentices working in Istanbul's Grand Bazaar and surrounding areas.

Initially, the society operated a small school in the Beyazıt district, repairing an old building known as the Valide School. The school, which began with a single classroom, provided free education and materials to students, with teachers volunteering their services. This initiative is often regarded as one of the first examples of a public school in the Ottoman Empire.

In 1867, the society began publishing a monthly journal titled Mebahis-i İlmiyye (Scientific Topics), which focused on positive sciences and attracted a wide readership, including students from the Imperial Military Academy.

The society's most significant achievement came in 1873 with the establishment of the Darüşşafakat’ül İslamiye school, a tuition-free boarding school for orphaned children. The school was built on land donated by Sultan Abdülaziz in the Fatih district of Istanbul. Designed by Italian architect Barironi and Ottoman architect Ohannes Kalfa, the school building was considered ahead of its time; though designed with facilities intended to eventually accommodate both boys and girls, female students were not admitted until much later.

The school's curriculum included primary, middle, and high school levels, with the final two years offering advanced courses equivalent to higher education. Graduates of Darüşşafaka were recognized as having completed a higher education program until 1894. The school also gained recognition for its focus on telegraphy, with the final year of study dedicated to this field.

The late 19th century was marked by significant challenges for Darüşşafaka. Russo-Turkish War, known as the "93 Harbi," disrupted education as the school building was used to house refugees. Many teachers, who were also military officers, were called to the front, leading to temporary closures of some classes.

In 1888, the society faced financial difficulties due to government restrictions on public gatherings. However, Sultan Abdulhamid II took the school under his protection, and state-supported donations helped stabilize its finances.

=== 20th century ===
In 1903, the Ottoman government temporarily took control of the school, integrating it into the state education system and altering its original mission by admitting children from wealthier families. This period ended in 1908 with the Young Turk Revolution, after which the society regained control of the school.

During World War I and the Turkish War of Independence, Darüşşafaka faced further financial strain but continued to operate, even expanding its curriculum to include teacher training programs.

Following the establishment of the Republic of Turkey in 1923, Darüşşafaka underwent significant reforms. The Tevhid-i Tedrisat (Unification of Education) Law of 1924 brought the school in line with the new secular and national education system. The school was reorganized as a full-cycle high school, and its graduates were granted direct admission to universities without entrance exams.

In 1931, the school introduced a literature track alongside its existing science-focused curriculum. The society also changed its name to Türk Okutma Kurumu (Turkish Education Society) in 1935, reflecting its alignment with the republic's nationalist ideals.

The mid-20th century saw Darüşşafaka expand its reach and modernize its facilities. In 1955, the school transitioned to a college-level institution, offering English-language education and extending its program to eight years. The society also began accepting students from outside Istanbul, holding entrance exams in cities like Ankara, Izmir, and Adana.

In 1971, Darüşşafaka became coeducational, admitting female students for the first time. The school's facilities were further upgraded in the 1970s, with the addition of modern classrooms, laboratories, and sports facilities.

=== 21st century ===
In the 21st century, Darüşşafaka has continued to adapt to changing educational needs. The society has embraced technology, introducing programs in robotics, digital literacy, and entrepreneurship. It has also expanded its scholarship programs, offering support to students from all 81 provinces of Turkey through initiatives like the "81 İlden 81 Öğrenci" (81 Students from 81 Provinces) project, launched in collaboration with Türkiye İş Bankası in 2008.

Darüşşafaka has also focused on sustainability and institutional governance, earning high marks in independent evaluations of its management practices. In 2015, the society was granted special consultative status by the United Nations Economic and Social Council (ECOSOC), recognizing its contributions to education and social development.

In response to the February 2023 earthquakes in Turkey, Darüşşafaka expanded its admissions to include children who lost parents in the disaster, providing them with full scholarships and boarding facilities. The society also launched a campaign to rebuild and expand its campus, aiming to increase its capacity to 1,500 students.

Currently, a new building planned to be a new middle school building is under construction.

== Institutions ==
=== Darüşşafaka Schools ===
Darüşşafaka Schools (Note: Although the literal turkish translation of the school name is "Darüşşafaka Educational Institutions", the official english translation is "Darüşşafaka Schools") is an educational institution in Turkey founded in 1873, distinguished as the country's first school established by a non-governmental organization. The school specializes in providing full-scholarship, boarding education to talented students from financially disadvantaged backgrounds, particularly those who have lost one or both parents. Located in the Maslak district of Istanbul, the institution offers comprehensive education from 5th grade through high school, with over 1,000 students currently enrolled. The school's admission process is designed to ensure equal educational opportunities, utilizing an aptitude-based entrance examination since the 2008-2009 academic year to select students based on potential rather than prior educational access. Instruction is conducted in both Turkish and English, with English-medium education implemented since 1955. The educational approach emphasizes experiential learning, with specialized laboratories for science, physics, chemistry, and information technology. Classrooms are maintained at a maximum of 20 students to ensure personalized attention. The curriculum extends beyond traditional academic subjects, incorporating critical thinking development, workshops in areas such as chess, drama, and writing, and encouraging a holistic approach to student development. Darüşşafaka's mission centers on nurturing students to become lifelong learners, researchers, and self-confident leaders, with a core principle of providing equal educational opportunities to talented youth regardless of their socioeconomic background.

=== Darüşşafaka Residences ===
Darüşşafaka Residences is a senior living facility established by the Darüşşafaka Society, first opened in 1997 with the Yakacık Residence and subsequently expanding to include locations in Maltepe, Şenesenevler, and Urla. The residential complex offers comprehensive care services for elderly donors of the organization, providing a range of accommodations including one-bedroom, two-bedroom, and suite-style apartments. Residents can access 24-hour medical services, including on-site emergency rooms, specialist medical teams, and healthcare coverage. The facilities feature nutritionist-designed meal plans, multiple dining options, and personalized dietary accommodations. Social programming is a key component of the residences, with over 300 annual internal and external activities including cultural events, hobby classes, exercise programs, and supervised outings. Residents enjoy amenities such as a heated swimming pool, fully equipped gym, hobby rooms, game lounges, and entertainment spaces. The residences emphasize individual freedom, allowing residents to maintain personal lifestyles, host guests, and come and go as they please while providing comprehensive security and support services. Donors can contribute to the residences through one-time donations in cash or real estate, with the option of receiving lifelong accommodations and healthcare in return. The facilities are staffed by over 100 personnel dedicated to ensuring residents' comfort, health, and quality of life.

==== Urla Yaşam ====
Urla Yaşam is a senior living and special care facility located in the Urla district of Izmir, Turkey, operated by the Darüşşafaka Society. The facility comprises 120 rooms and suites with a total capacity of 152 residents, offering both independent living and specialized care options. Designed to provide an alternative to traditional nursing homes, the facility features individual rooms with full bathrooms and mini kitchens, allowing residents to maintain personal autonomy. The facility generates additional funding for Darüşşafaka student education through resident fees, with any surplus income supporting the organization's educational mission. Medical services include 24-hour healthcare with a dedicated medical team, and a specialized care unit accommodating 52 patients with conditions such as Alzheimer's, dementia, Parkinson's, and requiring post-operative care. The facility provides comprehensive services including nutritionist-designed meal plans, room service, social activities, and personal care amenities. Urla Yaşam's Special Care Unit is equipped with state-of-the-art technology, featuring 36 standard rooms and 8 suites that can be converted to intensive care units, all furnished with specialized anti-wound orthopedic beds. Common areas include lounges, hobby rooms, TV rooms, a library, restaurant, and cafe, emphasizing a holistic approach to elder care that prioritizes medical support, social engagement, and individual comfort.

=== Sait Faik Abasıyanık Museum ===
Sait Faik Abasıyanık Museum, exhibiting the belongings, manuscripts, letters, photographs, postcards and many other objects and documents carrying the traces of memories of Sait Faik Abasıyanık, storyteller and a testator of Darüşşafaka Society, was opened to the public for the first time on August 22, 1959. Being under the control and responsibility of Darüşşafaka Society since the year 1964, this Museum was temporarily closed in 2009 for reinforcement, restoration and conservation works, and was then reopened on May 11, 2013 with its brand new look, and with a contemporary museology approach.

== See also ==
- Darüşşafaka (disambiguation)
- Darüşşafaka SK
