= Hüseyin Gelis =

Turkish business executive

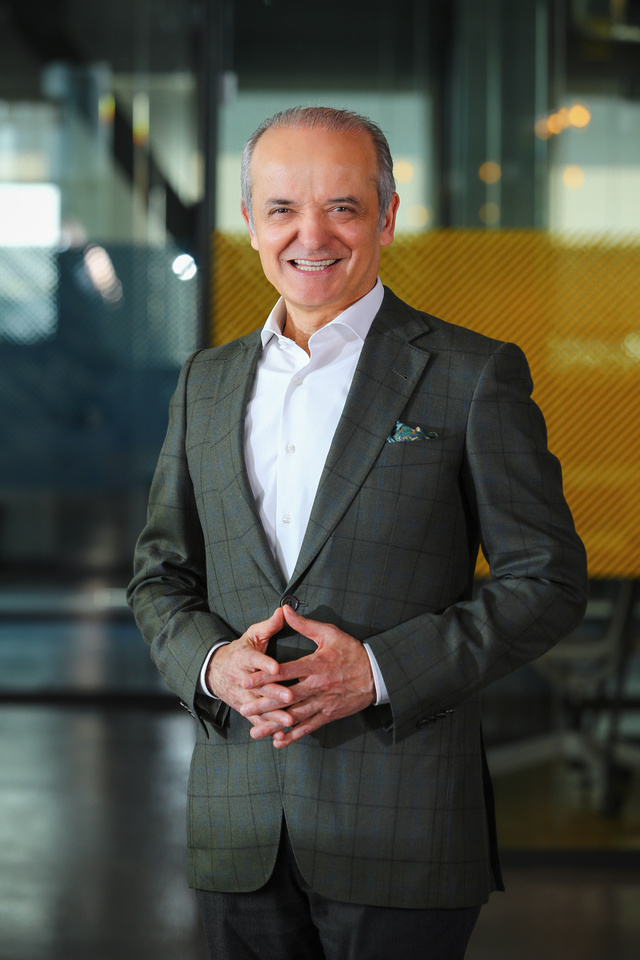
Huseyin Gelis, CEO and President of Siemens Turkey

Hüseyin Gelis (born September 5, 1959) is the president and CEO of Siemens Turkey.

== Education ==
He attended primary school, secondary school and high school in Germany. During his high school education, he completed an internship at Siemens, where he is CEO and president in Turkey. After studying micro and macro economics at University of California, Berkeley, Gelis graduated from the business administration department of University of Phoenix.

== Career ==
Starting his career in 1976 at the Siemens manufacturing facility focusing on telecommunication, Gelis worked in R&D, production, PBX systems, planning, logistics organization, and strategic purchasing groups successively.

After studying microchip production process in the US in 1987–1990, and doing market research in Argentina and Brazil, Gelis worked as Project Director at ROLM System, a joint venture of Siemens and IBM, between 1990 and 1993.

Returning to Turkey in 1993, Hüseyin Gelis worked as the Director of Corporate Networks Department at Simko, a joint venture of Koç Holding and Siemens, until 1996.

Between 1996 and 2000, Gelis was the Marketing and Sales Executive of cell phones and pagers division at Siemens global. Assigned to Siemens India as CFO and Vice President in 2000, Hüseyin Gelis was selected one of the “Top 10 CFOs” within the Fortune 500 corporations in Business Today's list of 2005.

After working as the Vice President and CFO of Siemens Canada, he was assigned as the CEO and president of Siemens Turkey on October 1, 2007.

As Chief Executive Officer, Hüseyin Gelis is responsible for the overall strategic management and leadership for all Siemens activities in Turkey. With 47 years of experience at Siemens, Gelis held various senior management positions within the global organization, including the United States, Germany, Brazil, Argentina, India, Canada, and Turkey.

Hüseyin Gelis also assumes tasks in a variety of non-governmental organizations. In 2015, Hüseyin Gelis took over the Presidency of TÜSİAD's (Turkish Industry and Business Association) Germany Network and became a member to the G20/B20 Turkey Digitalization Task Force.

A member of the Advisory Council of the Turkish-German Youth Bridge (Mercator Stiftung) since 2016, Hüseyin Gelis is also a Board Member of YASED (International Investors Association) since 2017 and the Vice Chairman as of February 2019.

Hüseyin Gelis signed PWN’s (Professional Women's Network) CEO Manifesto in Support of Social Gender Equality in 2018 and became an Equality Ambassador. He also acts as a Member of High Advisory Board of Darüşşafaka Association.

== Other memberships ==
Hacettepe University – Advisory Board Member

Izmir Institute of Technology – Advisory Board Member

Turkish – German University – Advisory Board Member

Having received various awards and recognitions in 47 years of service in business and social activities, Gelis was rewarded the Order of Merit (Bundesverdienstkreuz) by the German President for his contributions to building economic, political and cultural bonds between Turkey and Germany.Gelis was granted the title of honorary PhD by Turkish-German University in 2021 for his contributions to the development of Turkish-German relations, as well as of the university itself, becoming the first Turkish person to receive this title from the institution.

In 2022, he participated as a speaker in the "Twin Transformation in Global Supply Chains" panel at the COP27 Climate Change conference with TUSIAD.

According to the announcement made after the Ordinary General Assembly Meeting of Sabancı Holding for the year 2022 held on 30 March, he was appointed as an independent board member.

== Sources ==
- Darüşşafaka Society, Darüşşafaka Society – Supreme Committee Council
- Digital Today,Indias Best CFO's
- Interview on Emigration
- World Economic Forum, World Economic Forum 2012 on YouTube
- Yale, Yale World Fellows Conference
- Siemens Türkiye, Hüseyin Gelis Resmi Genel Müdürlük Duyurusu - siemens.com.tr
- En Onemlisi Heyecan Yaratmak (Hüseyin Geliş'in bir röportajı)
- Sürdürülebilir Gelecek
- Türkiye’nin Geleceği Eğitimde
- Her beyin bizim için ayrı bir değer
- Hürriyet, 1999 Marmara Depremi
