= Makbule Abasıyanık =

Turkish writer and philanthropist (1883-1963)

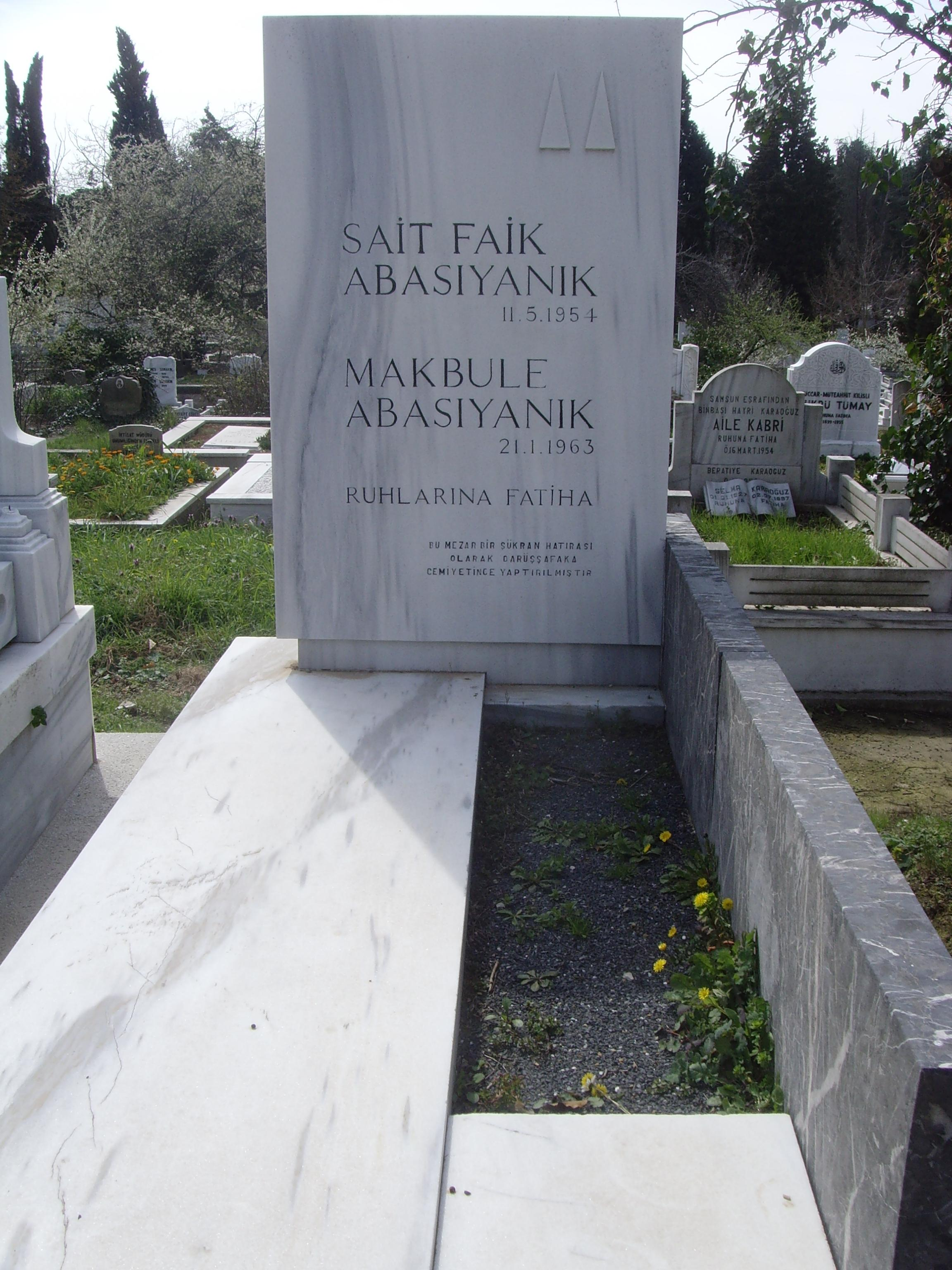
Graves of Makbule Abasıyanık and her son.

Makbule Abasıyanık (1883 – 22 January 1963) was a Turkish female writer and philanthropist.

As the mother of the short story writer Sait Faik Abasıyanık (1906 – 1954), she influenced him in his works. After the death of her son, Makbule Abasıyanık established the "Sait Faik Short Story Award" in 1959, and turned their residence on Burgazada, Istanbul into the Sait Faik Abasıyanık Museum the same year.

She died in Istanbul on 22 January 1963, and was interred at Zincirlikuyu Cemetery next to her son's grave.
