= Perili Köşk =

Historical building in Istanbul, Turkey

Coordinates: 41.0892°N 29.0544°E

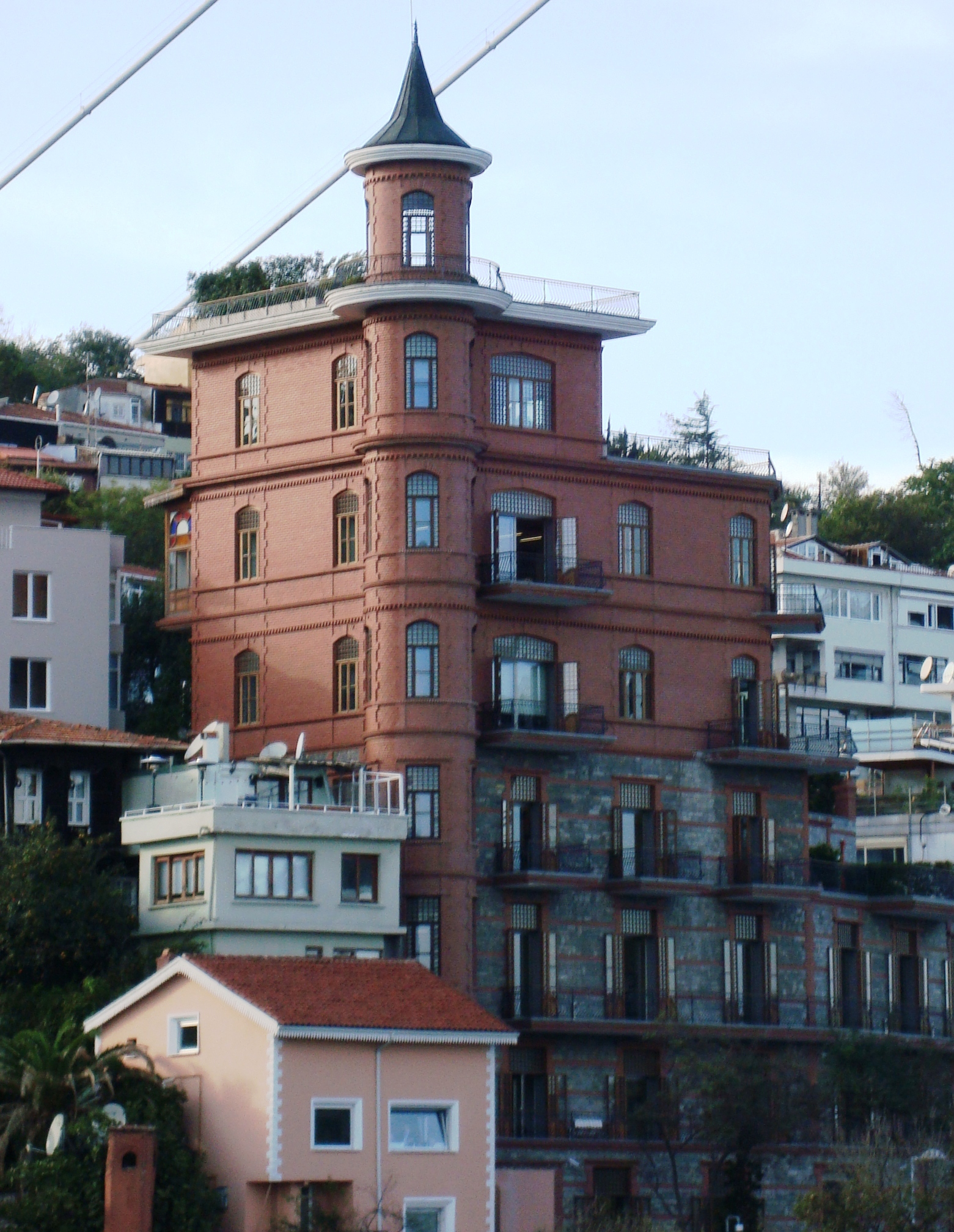
- Interactive map of the Perili Köşk area

General information
- Status: Active
- Location: Rumelihisarı, Sarıyer, Istanbul, Turkey
- Current tenants: Borusan Holding
- Years built: 1910–1914 (halted); 1995–2000
- Owner: Basri Erdoğan

Website
- https://www.borusancontemporary.com/

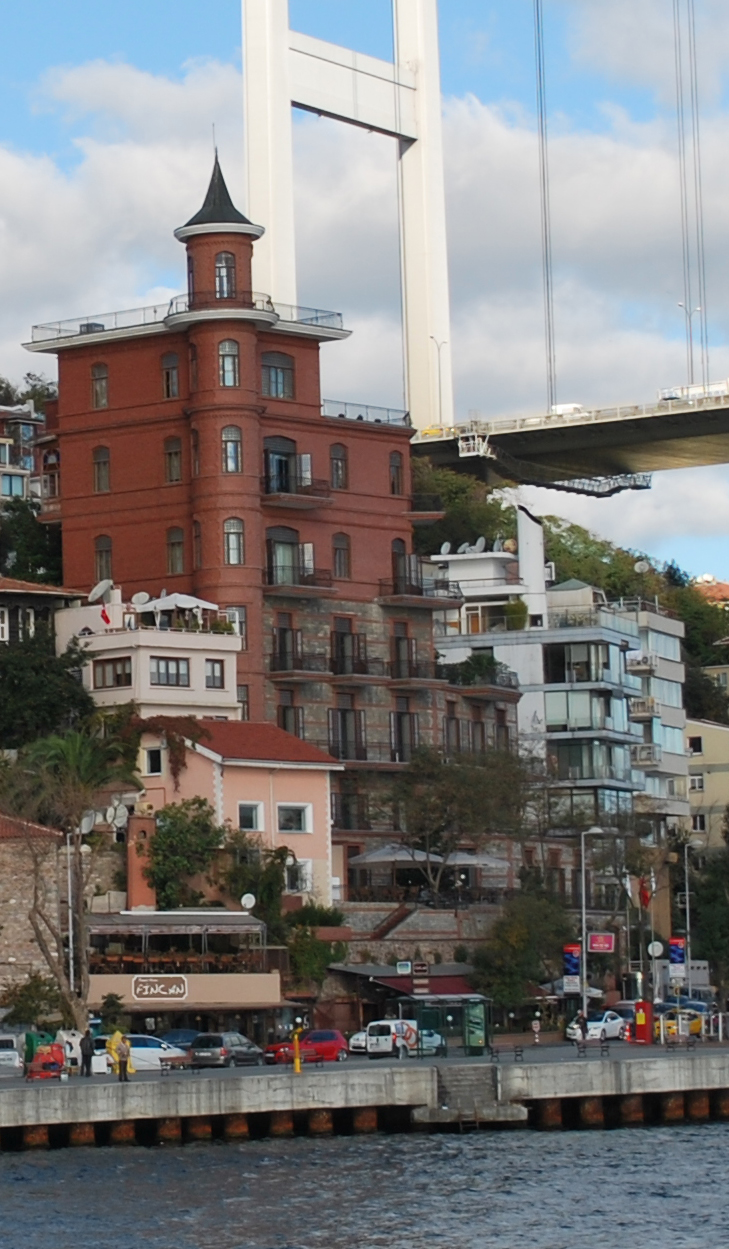
Perili Köşk

Perili Köşk (originally known as the Yusuf Ziya Pasha Mansion) is a historical building at the Rumelihisarı neighbourhood of the Sarıyer district in Istanbul, Turkey. The building currently serves as the headquarters of Borusan Holding, as well as its art museum, called Borusan Contemporary.

Built in 1911, the castle-like red brick mansion with stained glass windows is located close to the Fatih Sultan Mehmet Bridge, on the European shore of the Bosphorus strait. The building has 9 floors above ground level and has a gross floor area of around 5,000 m^{2} (54,000 sq ft).

The popular nickname of the mansion, Perili Köşk (meaning the "Haunted Mansion" in Turkish) refers to its construction remaining partially unfinished for a long period (its second and third floors remained empty for decades.) The building's exterior appearance was carefully restored and completed in line with the original design between 1995 and 2000 by architect Hakan Kıran, who also renovated its interior.

Perili Köşk is also the title of a story by the Turkish author Ömer Seyfettin.

== History ==
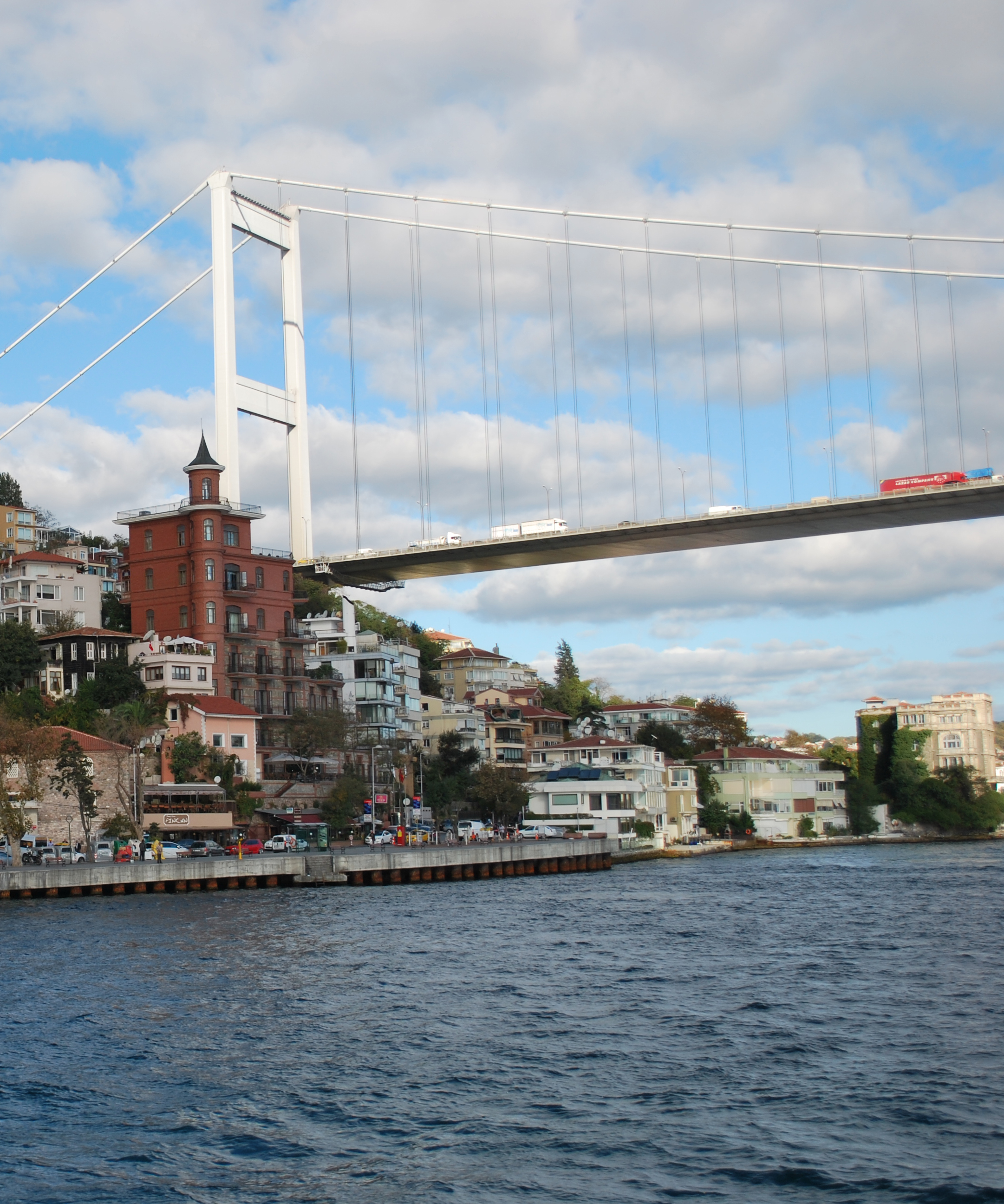
Perili Köşk (the castle-like red brick building in front of Fatih Sultan Mehmet Bridge's European tower) currently houses the headquarters of Borusan Holding and the Borusan Contemporary fine arts museum.

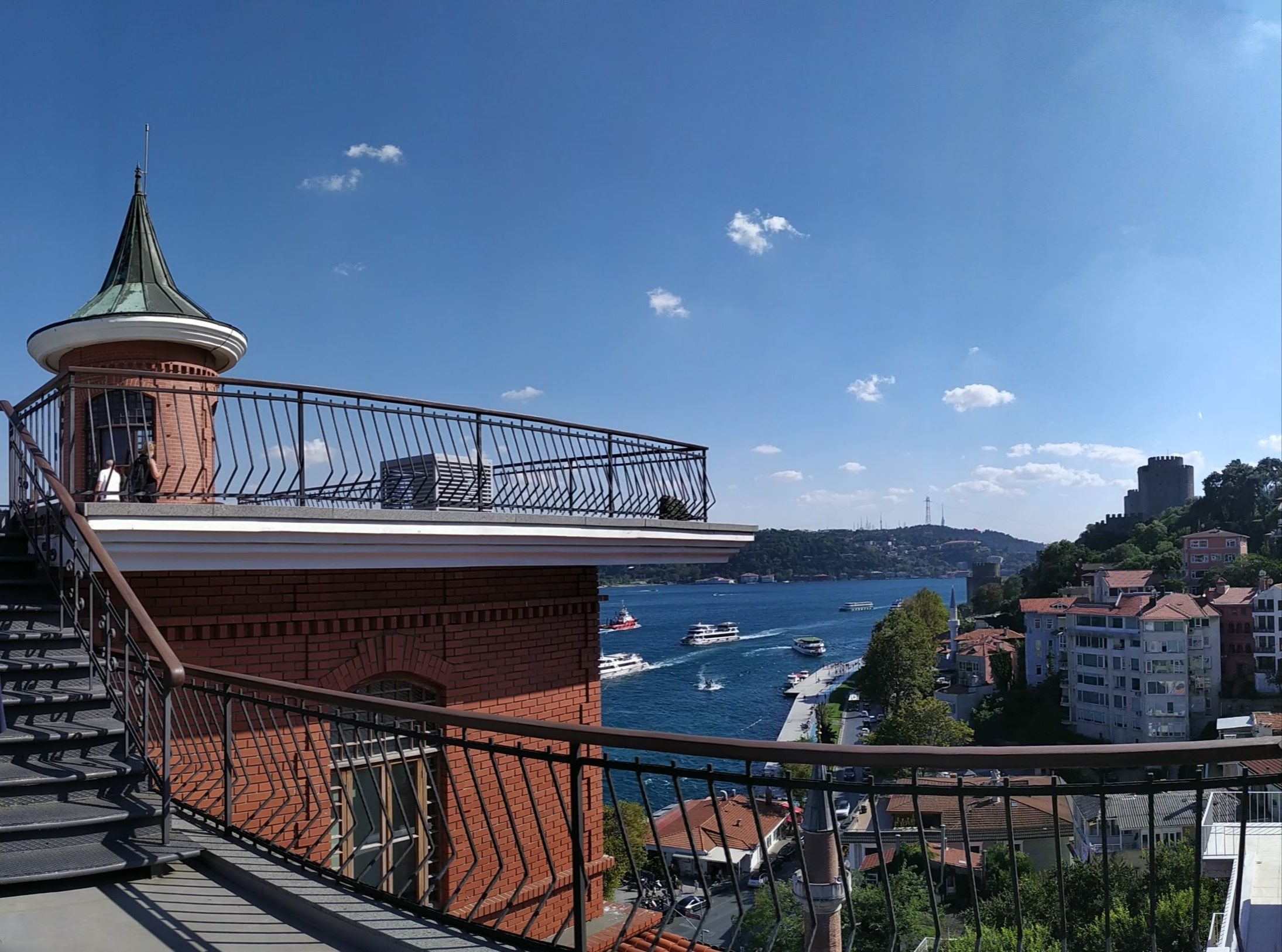
View from the building

The mansion was built by Ottoman ambassador to the United States Yusuf Ziya Pasha, a member of the Ottoman government, for his family's accommodation.

The construction of the building started in the early 1910s but stopped when the Ottoman Empire entered the First World War as craftsmen joined the armed forces. Yusuf Ziya Pasha's second wife Nebiye Hanım and her three daughters from her first husband lived in the mansion until 1926. After the death of Yusuf Ziya Pasha, the family continued to own the mansion until the early 1990s.

== Renovation ==
The mansion was bought in 1993 by philanthropist businessman Basri Erdoğan. In 1995, the renovation of the building started. Realized by architect Hakan Kıran, the renovation work took about five years and was completed in 2000. The general outlook and facade of the building were kept loyal to the original design and the mansion was carefully restored with the precise materials, such as the bricks which were imported from the United Kingdom.

The resale value of Perili Köşk was rated at 40 million USD by Century 21 Real Estate in 2003.

== Office building and fine arts museum ==
The inner space of the building was modernised to be used as offices. In May 2002 Borusan Holding, a Turkish industrial conglomerate, took a 25-year lease on the property which it uses as its headquarters. Staff moved into the building on 16 February 2007, and an official opening ceremony was held on 27 June 2007.

In September 2011 Borusan opened Borusan Contemporary, an art museum at Perili Köşk.
