= Sait Faik Abasıyanık =

Turkish writer of short stories and poetry (1906-1954)

- Born: 18 November 1906; Adapazarı, Ottoman Empire
- Died: 11 May 1954 (aged 47); Istanbul, Turkey
- Occupation: Short story writer
- Mother: Makbule Abasıyanık
- Writing career
- Language: Turkish

Sait Faik Abasıyanık (18 November 1906 – 11 May 1954) was one of the greatest Turkish writers of short stories and poetry and considered an important literary figure of the 1940s. He created a brand new style in Turkish literature and brought new life to Turkish short story writing with his harsh but humanistic portrayals of labourers, fishermen, children, the unemployed, and the poor. His stories focused on the urban lifestyle and he portrayed the denizens of the darker places in Istanbul. He also explored the "...torments of the human soul and the agony of love and betrayal..."

== Biography ==
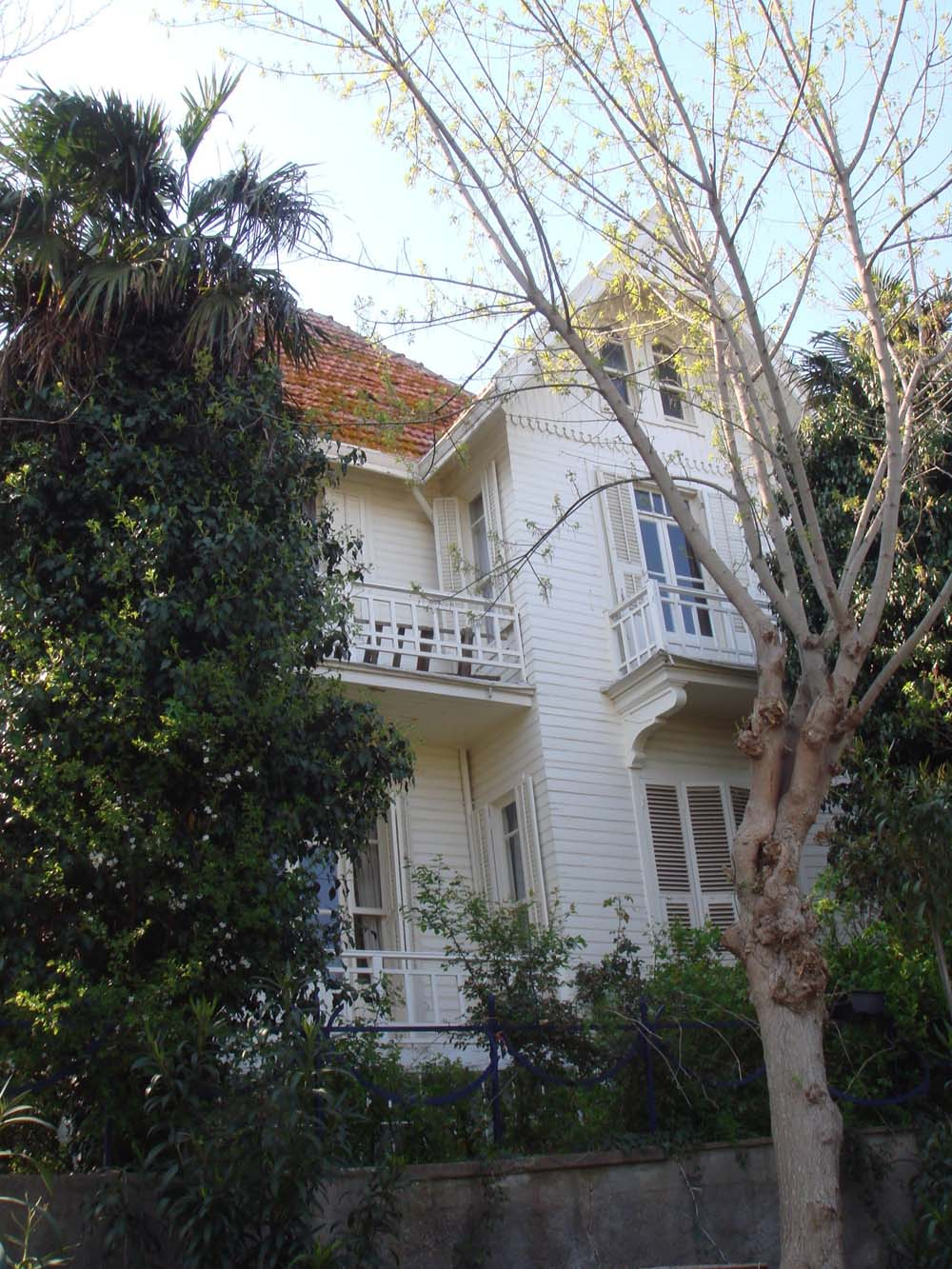
His home in Burgazada, now the Sait Faik Museum

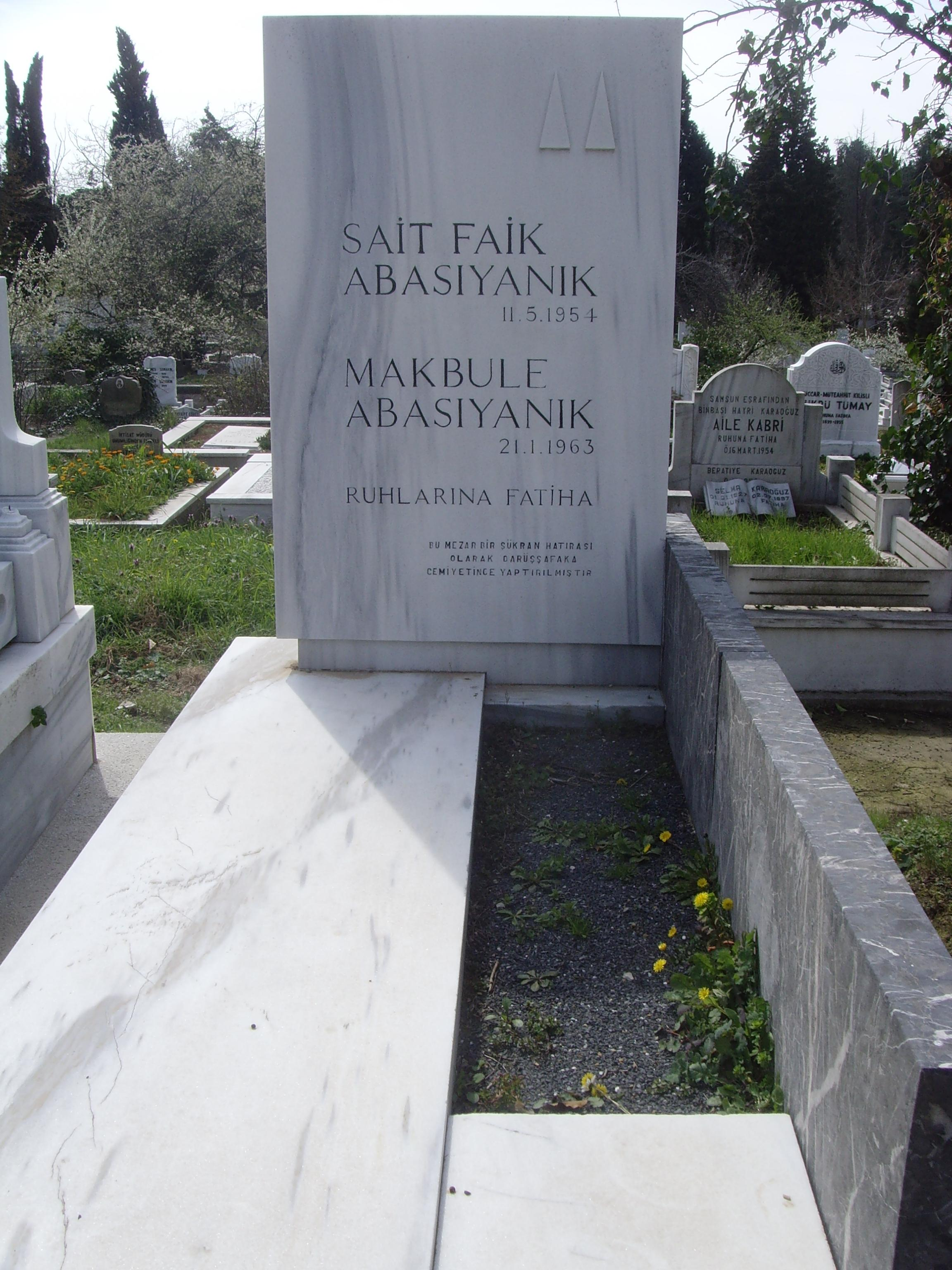
Grave of Sait Faik Abasıyanık and his mother Makbule

Born in Adapazarı, on 18 November 1906, he was educated at Istanbul Lisesi in Istanbul and then in Bursa. He enrolled in the Turcology Department of Istanbul University in 1928, but under pressure from his father went to Switzerland to study economics in 1930. He left school and lived from 1931 to 1935 in France (mainly Grenoble) – an experience which had a deep impact on his art and character. After returning to Turkey he taught Turkish in Halıcıoğlu Armenian School for Orphans, and tried to follow his father's wishes and go into business but was unsuccessful. At this time he also began to publish his pieces in Varlık, a national periodical.

In 1936, he published his first book of short stories, Semaver. The majority of his work consisted of short stories; however, in 1952 he wrote a novel, Bir Takım Insanlar, which was censored due to its portrayal of the class system. A major theme of his was always the ocean and he spent most of his time in Burgazada (one of the Princes' Islands in the Marmara Sea). He became an honorary member of the International Mark Twain Society of St. Louis, Missouri on 14 May 1939. A number of researchers and critics, with a view to Sait Faik's last stories, have claimed that he tended towards surrealism. The themes of those last stories and their language and narrative deeply affected the post-1950 writers in particular through these changes. Because of the originality of his style, he has been considered as the source of himself. He died on 11 May 1954 in Istanbul.

Sait Faik mostly published under the name Sait Faik, other pen names being Adalı ("Island dweller"), Sait Faik Adalı, and S. F..

== Bibliography ==
Works by Sait
Year	Name	Translated name	Type
1936	Semaver	The Samovar	Short stories
1939	Sarnıç	The Cistern	Short stories
1940	Şahmerdan	The Pile Driver	Short stories
1944	Medarı Maişet Motoru	The Boat of Livelihood	Novel
1948	Lüzumsuz Adam	The Useless Man	Short stories
1950	Mahalle Kahvesi	Local Coffee Shop	Short stories
1951	Havada Bulut	Cloud in the Sky	Short stories
1951	Kumpanya	The Troupe	Short stories
1952	Havuz Başı	The Poolside	Short stories
1952	Son Kuşlar	The Last Birds	Short stories
1953	Kayıp Aranıyor	The Missing	Novel
1953	Şimdi Sevişme Vakti	Now is the Time for Making Love	Poems
1954	Alemdağ'da Var Bir Yılan	There's a Snake at Alemdağ	Short stories
1954	Az Şekerli	Just A Little Sugar	Short stories
1955	Tüneldeki Çocuk	Boy in a Tunnel	Short stories
1956	Mahkeme Kapısı	Law Court	Reportage

== Legacy ==
Sait Faik left his wealth to the Darüşşafaka School for orphans. The Sait Faik foundation is still run by Darüşşafaka Society, maintaining his Burgaz House as the Sait Faik Abasıyanık Museum and since 1954 giving the annual Sait Faik Literature Prize to the best collection of short stories. The first Sait Faik Short Story prize winner was "Gazoz Ağacı" by Sabahattin Kudret Aksal and this most prestigious literary prize has been given so far to some of the best Turkish authors including Pınar Kür, Tomris Uyar, Füruzan and Nazlı Eray.
