= Borusan =

Turkish industrial group

Borusan Holding A.Ş

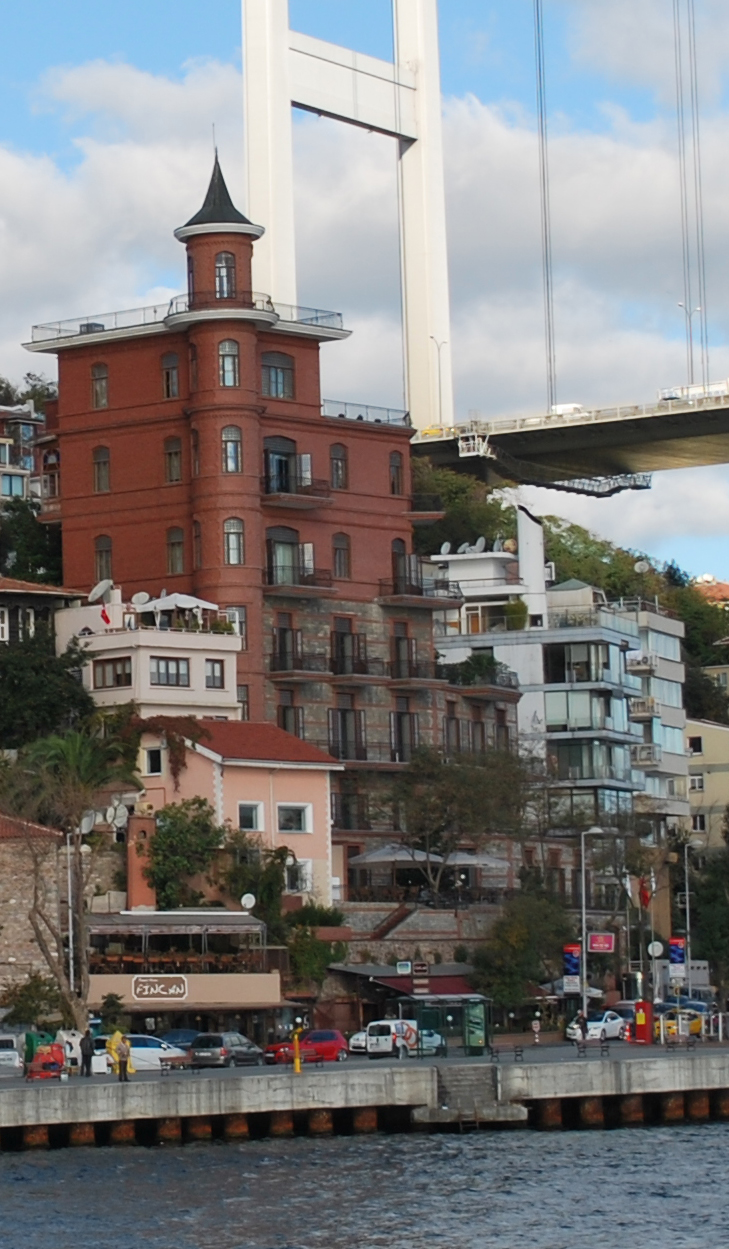
- Borusan Holding Headquarters Perili Köşk
- Company type: Anonim Şirket
- Traded as: BİST: BRYAT; BİST: BRSAN
- Industry: Industry
- Founded: 1944
- Founder: Asım Kocabıyık
- Headquarters: Istanbul, Turkey
- Area served: Worldwide
- Key people: Ahmet Kocabıyık (Chairman); Agah Uğur (CEO)
- Revenue: ▲$7.7 billion (2023)
- Operating income: ▲$1 billion (2023)
- Net income: ▲$555 million (2023)
- Total assets: ▲$5.2 billion (2023)
- Total equity: ▲$2 billion (2023)
- Number of employees: 14.000+
- Website: borusan.com.tr

Borusan Holding A.Ş. is a Turkish industrial group headquartered in Istanbul, Turkey. Its activities include steel manufacturing, car distribution, energy generation and logistics. The company was founded by Asım Kocabıyık in 1944 to trade iron and steel. Today, Borusan operates in 11 countries over 3 continents.

== History ==
Borusan began in 1944 as İstikbal Ticaret, trading in iron, steel and agricultural products. The first industrial enterprise was steel pipe manufacturing in 1958, a business which expanded throughout the 1960s and 1970s into manufacturing industrial machinery, valves for internal combustion engines, and logistics. By 1972, after integrating the steel pipe operations, all Borusan companies were brought together under Borusan Holding. In 1977 Borusan Yatırım was founded, combining Borusan companies operating in steel, distributorship and integrated logistics industries.

In 1984, Borusan Otomotiv became the main distributor of BMW in Turkey, later expanding to distribute Caterpillar earth moving equipment and Land Rover vehicles.

In 1998, Borusan Yatırım went public and Borusan went into partnership with Mannesmann. Its annual steel pipe production capacity rose to 1 million tons, from factories in Gemlik, Istanbul and İzmit. Borusan has a factory in Italy with a production capacity of 32,000 tons per year of cold drawn pipe.

In 2012, Borusan Pipe decided to establish a pipe manufacturing facility with an annual capacity of 300 thousand tons in United States. The facility was opened in Houston two years later at a cost of 150 million dollars.

In 2014, the Borusan Istanbul Philharmonic Orchestra was invited to the BBC Proms classical music festival. The concert was attended by 6,000 people.

Borusan's joint venture with ArcelorMittal, Borcelik, is the biggest galvanized steel manufacturer in Turkey.

== Headquarters ==
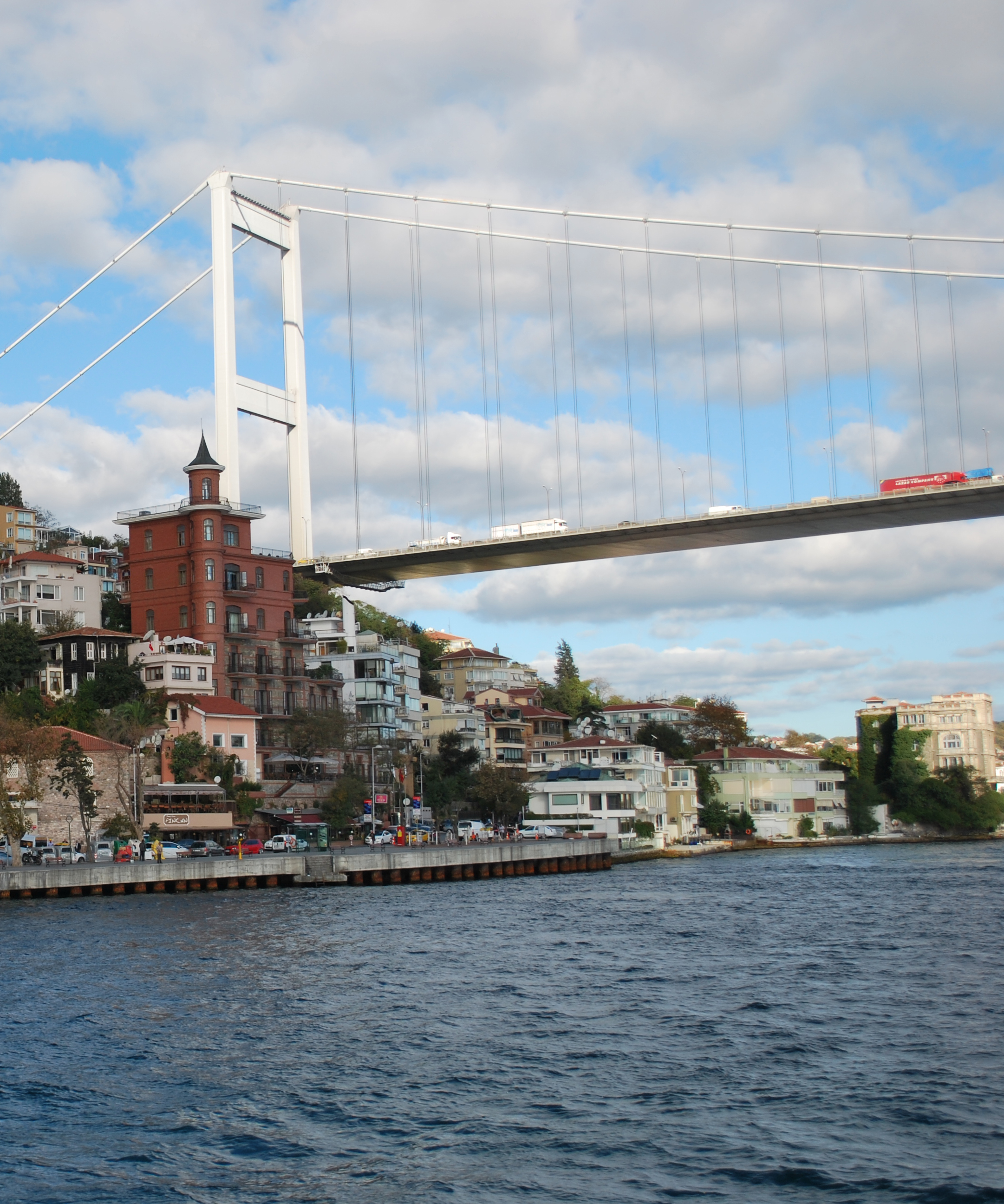
Borusan headquarters is known as Perili Köşk.

The headquarters of the Borusan Group is in Sarıyer, Istanbul, overlooking the Bosphorus. The headquarters building is known as the Perili Köşk (Haunted House). The building also includes a public art gallery and the Borusan Contemporary museum.

== Management ==
Asım Kocabıyık founded Borusan Holdings in 1972 and headed the company for 57 years. His son Ahmet Kocabıyık has been the chairman of Borusan Group since 2001. Borusan Holding's CEO is Erkan Kafadar.

== Fields of activities ==
=== Steel Group ===
- Borçelik (joint venture with ArcelorMittal)
- Borusan Pipe
- Borusan Mühendislik
- İstikbal Ticaret
- Kerim Çelik

=== Distributorship Group ===
- Borusan Otomotiv: exclusive distributor of BMW Group and Jaguar Land Rover Group brands in Turkey
- Borusan Makina ve Güç Sistemleri: exclusive distributor of Caterpillar products in Turkey, Russia, Azerbaijan, Kazakhstan, Georgia and Kyrgyzstan
- parcapazari.com: an e-commerce startup for aftermarket automotive parts
- Borusan Araç İhale
- Supsan

=== Energy Group ===
- Borusan EnBW Enerji (joint venture with EnBW)

=== Logistics Group ===
- Borusan Lojistik
- Bukoli
- eTA

== See also ==
- Perili Köşk - the headquarters of Borusan Holding and the Borusan Contemporary art museum is a historical monument in the Rumelihisarı neighbourhood of Istanbul.
- Borusan Otomotiv Motorsport - a Turkish auto racing team.
- List of companies of Turkey
