= Sait Faik Abasıyanık Museum =

- Sait Faik Abasıyanık Müzesi
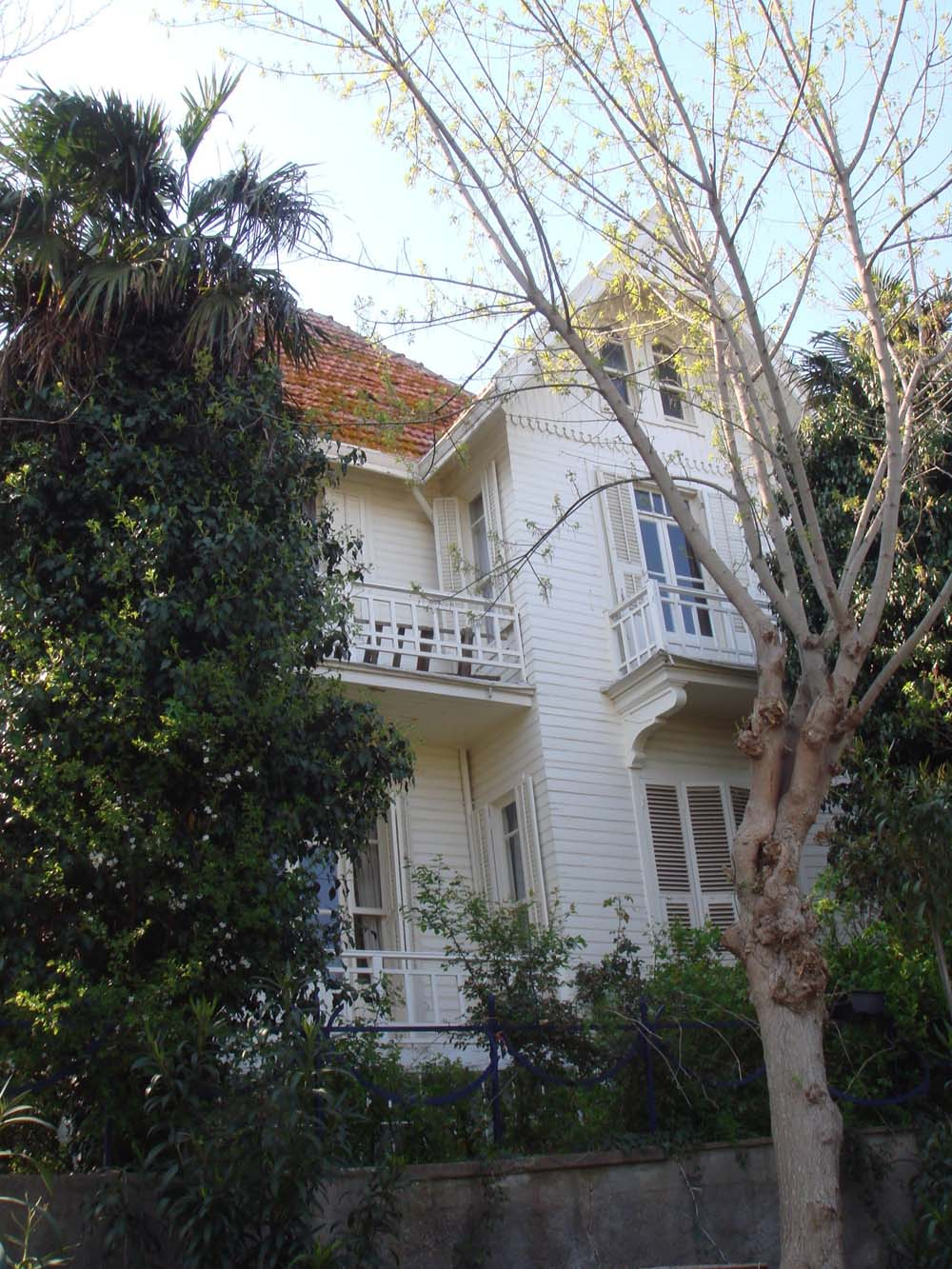
- Sait Faik Abasıyanık Museum

- Location of Sait Faik Abasıyanık Museum in Istanbul
- Established: 1959; 67 years ago
- Coordinates: 40°52′52″N 29°04′03″E
- Type: Historic house
- Owner: Darüşşafaka Association

Sait Faik Abasıyanık Museum (Turkish: Sait Faik Abasıyanık Müzesi) is a historic house museum dedicated to the writer Sait Faik Abasıyanık in Istanbul, Turkey.

The museum is on Burgazada Island of the Princes' Islands in Istanbul.

Sait Faik Abasıyanık (1906–1954) was a Turkish short story writer. After his death, his home was converted into a museum. During his lifetime he had donated the building to Darüşşafaka Association, a non-governmental institution to support the education of the poor fatherless. In 1964, ten years after his death, Darüşşafaka took over the responsibility of the museum. The museum was opened on 22 August 1959. In 2009, the museum building underwent a restoration, and on 11 May 2013, it was reopened to visits.

The building consists of a basement, ground floor and two upper floors. The reading room and the slide show room are in the basement. The dining and the guest room are in the ground floor. The bed room and the reading room as well as two rooms reserved for his life story are in the first floor. The exhibitions about the Burgazada and the room of letters are in the second floor.
