= Yusuf Ziya Pasha =

Ottoman politician and diplomat

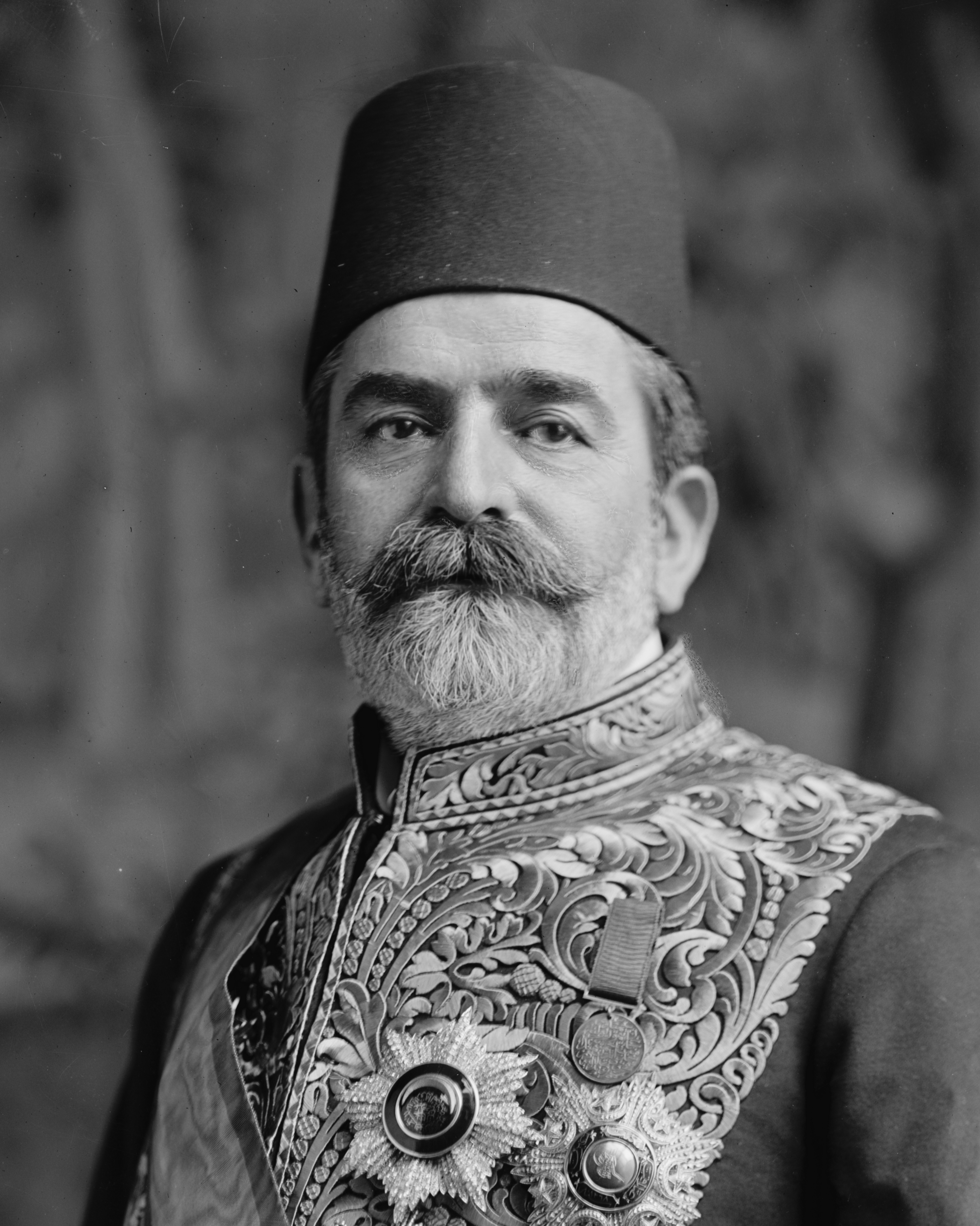

Ottoman Ambassador to United States
- In office 14 June 1910 – 1914
- Monarch: Mehmed V

Personal details
- Born: 1849 Ottoman Empire
- Died: 1929 (aged 79–80) Istanbul (known in English at the time as Constantinople), Turkey

Yusuf Ziya Pasha (1849 – 1929), also known as Youssouf Zia Pacha, was an Ottoman politician and government minister, who was one of the figureheads of the Committee of Union and Progress (CUP). He was the Ottoman ambassador to the United States from June 14, 1910 to 1914.

His residence was Perili Köşk in Constantinople (now Istanbul) (originally known as the Yusuf Ziya Pasha Mansion). The building currently houses the headquarters of Borusan and the Borusan Contemporary art museum.
