= Hüseyin Tevfik Pasha =

Turkish diplomat and mathematician

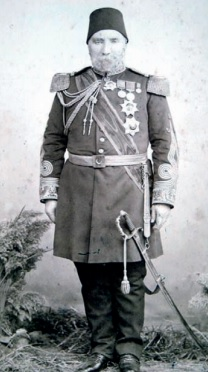
Hüseyin Tevfik Pasha

Hüseyin Tevfik Pasha (1832 in Vidin, Ottoman Empire (now in Bulgaria) – 16 June 1901 in Constantinople (now Istanbul)) was a mathematician, author, and government official from the Ottoman Empire He served as military adjutant and Envoy of the Ottoman Empire to the United States, and served as Ottoman Minister of Finance from January – July 1881, and October 1897 – August 1898.

He is remembered for his Linear Algebra (1882, 1892) which outlined some vector algebra including a "special perpendicular" (cross product) and properties of curves. The book title was precocious since the early vector algebra was generalized in vector space, and this concept later produced linear algebra. He is known as Tawfiq Pasha of Vidin or as Vidinli Huseyin, Tawfiq Pasha in Turkish literature.

== Life ==
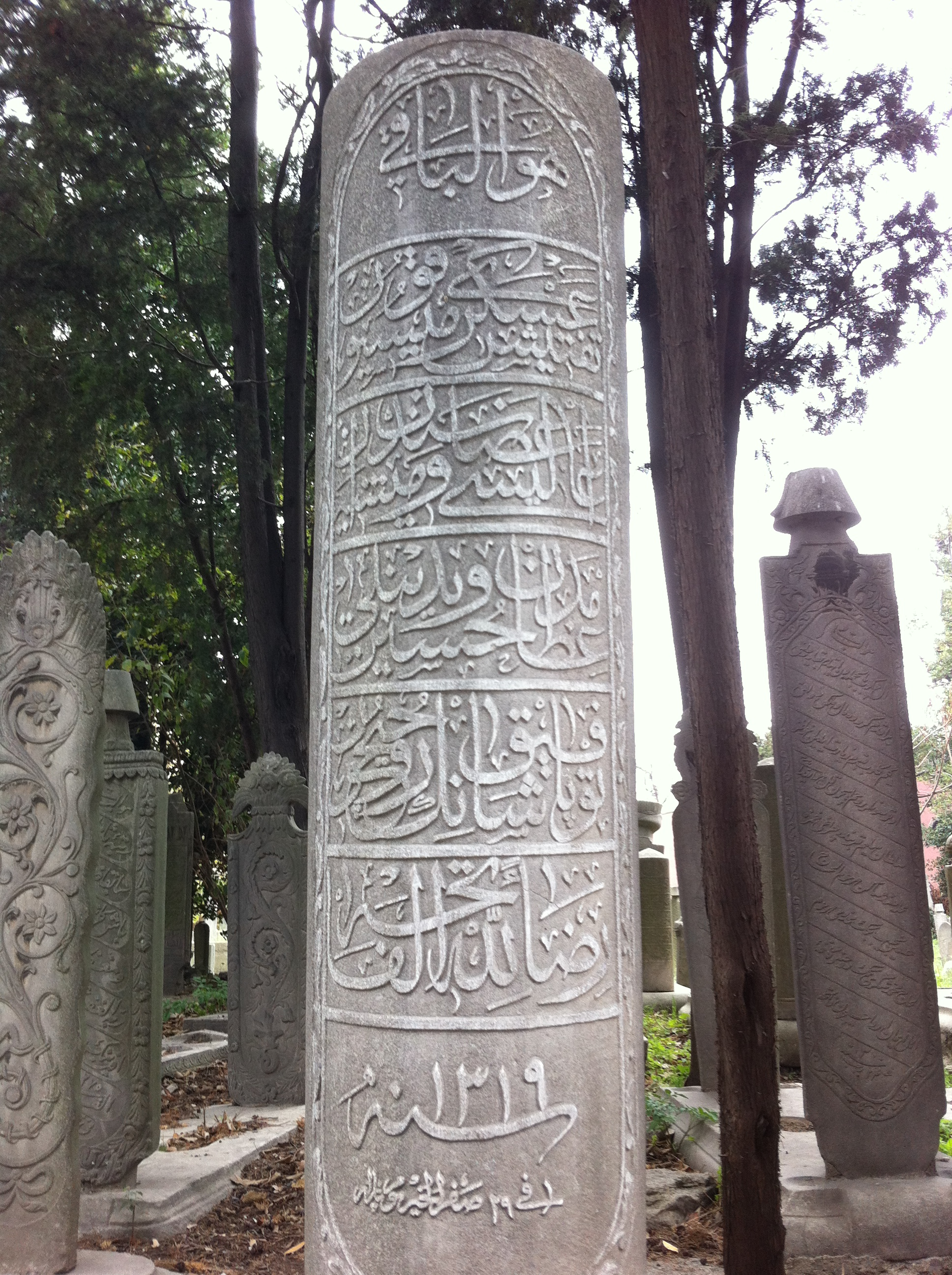
The tombstone of Hüseyin Tevfik Pasha in Eyüp Sultan

At age 14 he moved to Constantinople to study painting. In 1844 his schooling was in Euclidean geometry, he studied with Tahir Pasha. He graduated in 1860. Upon the death of his teacher, Tevfik took over his classes and began to instruct students in algebra, analytic geometry, calculus, mechanics and astronomy.

Tevfik was sent to Paris and became associated with the Young Ottomans there:

Afterwards, Vidinli Tawfik was sent to Paris by Chief Commander Hüseyin Avni Pasha to inspect ballistics and rifle production and he stayed there two years as Military Attaché. He also became the deputy principal of the Mekteb-i Osmanî (School of Ottomans) in Paris. Meanwhile, alongside studying at the factory, he attended Paris University and Collège de France to improve his mathematical knowledge. He got in touch with the famous Turkish author Namık Kemal and other Turkish intellectuals and was welcomed by them.

Tevfik's expertise in small arms led to assignments to the United States:

In 1872, Tawfik Pasha was appointed as a member of the committee which was established to inspect Henry and Martini rifles production which was ordered from United States by the Ottoman State. He went to the United States to learn English and also to inspect rifles production. After two years he came back to Istanbul (1874). After a couple of months he went to the United States again. After four years he came back to Istanbul and was appointed as a Minister of Imperial School of Military Engineering.

In 1878 he taught military engineering in Constantinople, and published Linear Algebra (first edition) in 1882. He continued in diplomatic and military service:

In 1883 Hüseyin Tawfiq was appointed to Washington as Minister Plenipotentiary. After finishing this task he came back to Istanbul to occupy the office of member of the commission for military inspection and then he went to Germany as head of the commission which established to inspect the Mauser rifles which he would buy for the military service.

According to Sinan Kuneralp, Tawfik was "A mathematician of great talent, he assembled during his long stay a valuable library of scientific works and regularly lectured on a variety of subjects in clubs and institutes on the East coast". Tevfik was also offended by what he considered to be excess liberty and license among the lower classes in the United States.

== Linear Algebra ==
Linear Algebra by Hüseyin Tevfik Pasha

In İstanbul in 1882 Tevfik published Linear Algebra with the presses of A. Y. Boyajian. He begins with the concept of equipollence:

By the expression AB = NO, in Linear Algebra and in the science of Quaternions also, it is understood that the length of AB is equal to that of NO, and also that the direction of line AB is the same as that of NO. (page one)

The book has five chapters and an appendix "Complex quantities and quaternions" in 68 pages with contents listed on page 69.

Tevfik's book refers on page 11 to Introduction to Quaternions by Kelland and Tait which came out with a second edition in 1882. But complex numbers and quaternions are missing. Rather a three-dimensional treatment of geometry uses vectors extensively. A space algebra is introduced (page 16) with $\rho = x i + y \sqrt{-i} + z \perp .$ Products are given: :

$$(\perp)^2 = -i, \ \ \sqrt{-i} \ \times \perp \ =\ +i, \ \ \perp \times \ \sqrt{-i} \ =\ -i.$$

Chapter three treats the cross product of vectors, calling it the "special perpendicular" and writing $\Pi_{\alpha \beta}$ for the cross product of α and β. The special perpendicular is employed to compute the volume of a pyramid (p 35), an equation on skew lines that reduces to zero when they are coplanar, a property of a spherical triangle, and the coincidence of the perpendiculars in a tetrahedron.

Chapter four describes equations of geometric figures: line, plane, circle, sphere. The definition of a conic section is taken from Kelland and Tait: "the locus of a point which move so that its distance from a fixed point bears a constant ratio to its distance from a fixed straight line." Ellipse, hyperbola, and parabola are then illustrated.

Chapter five, "Some additional applications" introduces the instantaneous velocity of a point moving along a curve as a limit, a reference to calculus. The second rate of change is related to the reciprocal of the radius of curvature of the curve (p. 59)

== See also ==
- A History of Vector Analysis
- History of quaternions
- Pasha
