= Kokkari =

Village on Samos, Greece

Kokkari Κοκκάρι
- Community
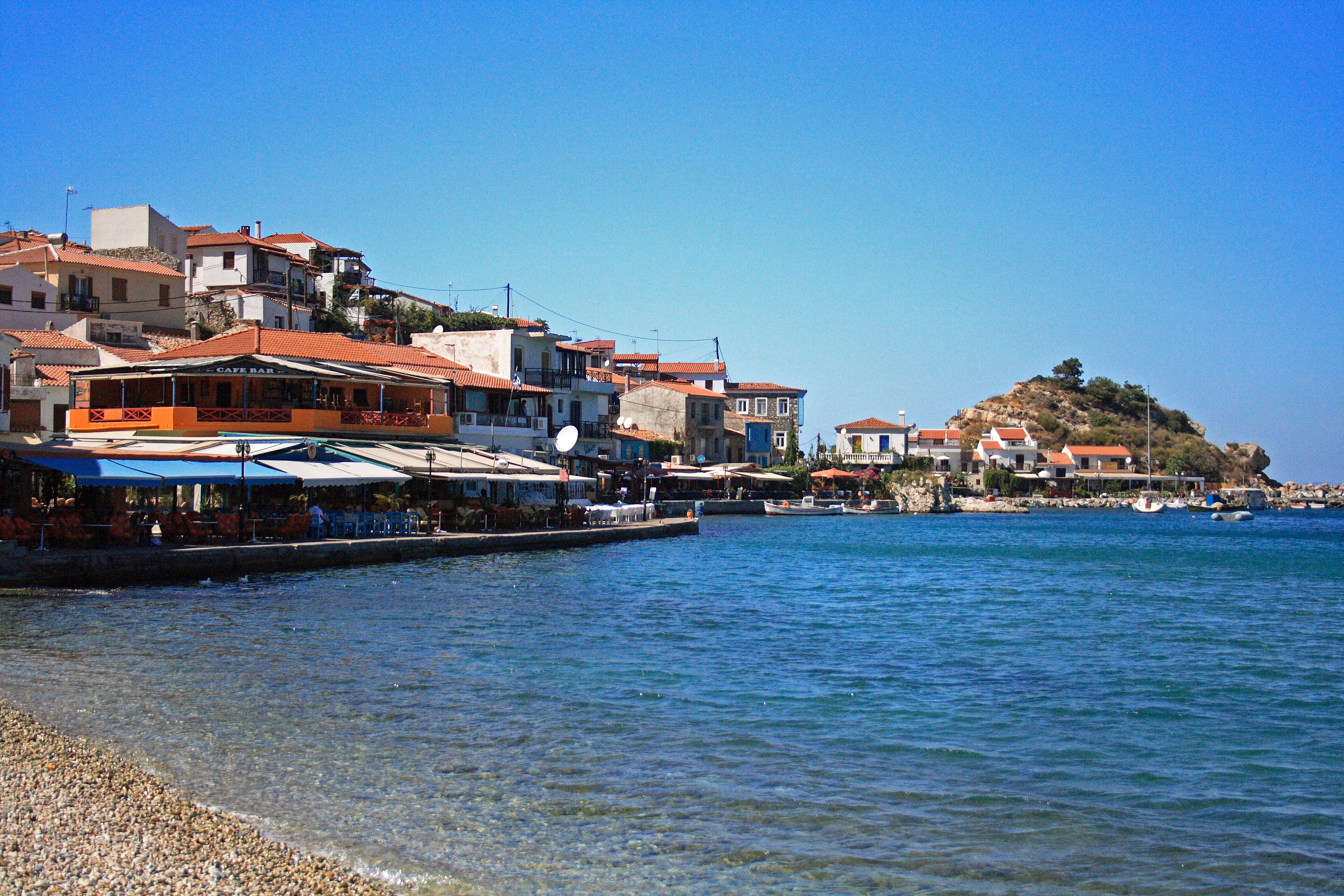

- Location within Greece
- Coordinates: 37°46′33″N 26°53′12″E
- Country: Greece
- Administrative region: North Aegean
- Regional unit: Samos
- Municipality: East Samos
- Municipal unit: Vathy

Population (2021)
  - Community: 933
- Time zone: UTC+2 (EET)
  - Summer (DST): UTC+3 (EEST)

Kokkari is a village on the island of Samos, Greece, about 10 kilometres (6.2 mi) from the capital city, Samos.

== Description ==
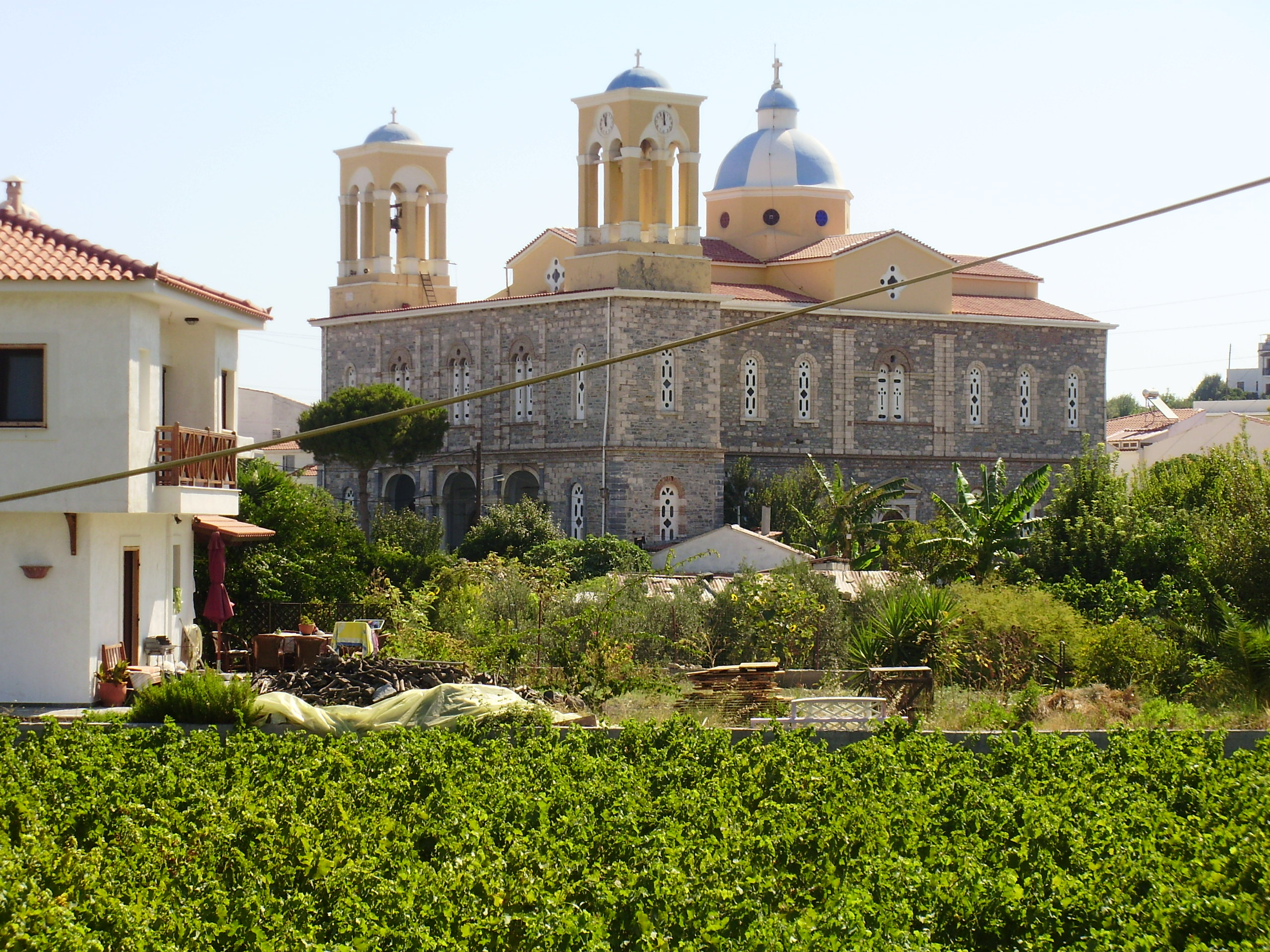
The main Orthodox church of Kokkari

Kokkari is a fishing harbour of Samos Island, which has now developed into a tourist center. Still, it preserves its traditional face, with small houses and lanes full of flowers. Kokkari is on a small peninsula full of houses which climbs up to the top of the hill with a small harbour on one side and a pebble beach on the other. Surrounded by green mountains and the view out to the sea.

Near Kokkari are several villages like Platanakia, Valeodates, Staurinides as well as many others, which are all connected with streets or small paths. Hiking paths lead all around the island. Find many hidden pebble beaches, like Tsamadou (named after the Greek national hero Anastasios Tsamados), Tsambou, Lemonakia close to Kokkari.

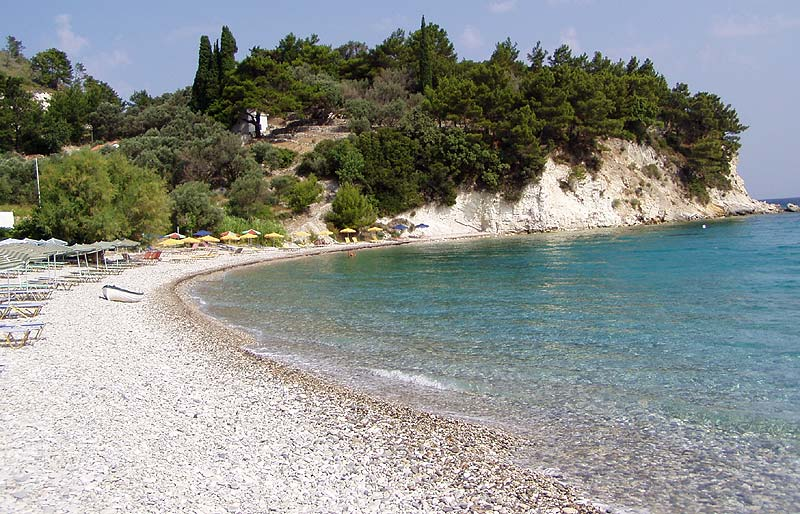
Tsamadou Beach
