= Rhoecus =

Samian sculptor

Rhoecus (or Rhaecus, Rhœcus, Rhæcus, Rhoikos) (Ancient Greek: Ῥοῖκός) was a Greek Samian sculptor of the 6th century BCE. He and his son Theodorus were especially noted for their work in bronze. Herodotus says that Rhoecus built the temple of Hera at Samos, which was destroyed by fire c. 530 BCE. In the temple of Artemis at Ephesus was a marble figure of Night (Nyx) by Rhoecus. His name has been found on a fragment of a vase which he dedicated to Aphrodite at Naucratis. His sons Theodorus and Telecles made a statue of the Pythian Apollo for the Samians.

Rhoecus was also the name of a centaur, who together with another centaur called Hylaeus, tried to rape Atalanta, but she killed them both.
