= Theodorus of Samos =

6th-century BC Greek sculptor, architect

Theodorus of Samos (Greek: Θεόδωρος ὁ Σάμιος) was a 6th-century BC ancient Greek sculptor and architect from the Greek island of Samos. Along with Rhoecus, he was often credited with the invention of ore smelting and, according to Pausanias, the craft of casting. He is also credited with inventing a water level, a carpenter's square, and, according to Pliny, a lock and key and the turning lathe. According to Vitruvius (vii, introduction), Theodorus is the architect of the Doric order temple Heraion of Samos temple. In some texts he is described, above all, as a great artist and in some statues he is depicted as a great inventor.

The ancient historian Herodotus twice refers to Theodorus as "the son of Telecles," a Samian artist. Herodotus credits Theodorus along with Rhoecus with improving the process of mixing copper and tin to form bronze, as well as being the first to use it in casting. Elsewhere, he credits Theodorus alone for discovering the art of fusing iron and using it to cast statues.

Carl Sagan, in the episode "The Backbone of Night" from his series Cosmos, states that Theodorus is credited with inventing the level, the ruler, the key, the square, the lathe, and bronze casting.

Theodorus wrote a now lost book on the Third Temple of Hera at Samos, the earliest architectural treatise of which we have the name.

Athenaeus, in his work on the luxury of the Persian court of Alexander the Great, notes that a certain Amyntas in his own work "Posts" spoke of a golden bowl that was present by the king's bed chamber, adjacent to a vine adorned with precious stones as grapes, and that this bowl was the handiwork of Theodorus of Samos.
