= Samos =

Greek island in the eastern Aegean Sea

Samos Περιφερειακή ενότητα Σάμου
- Regional unit
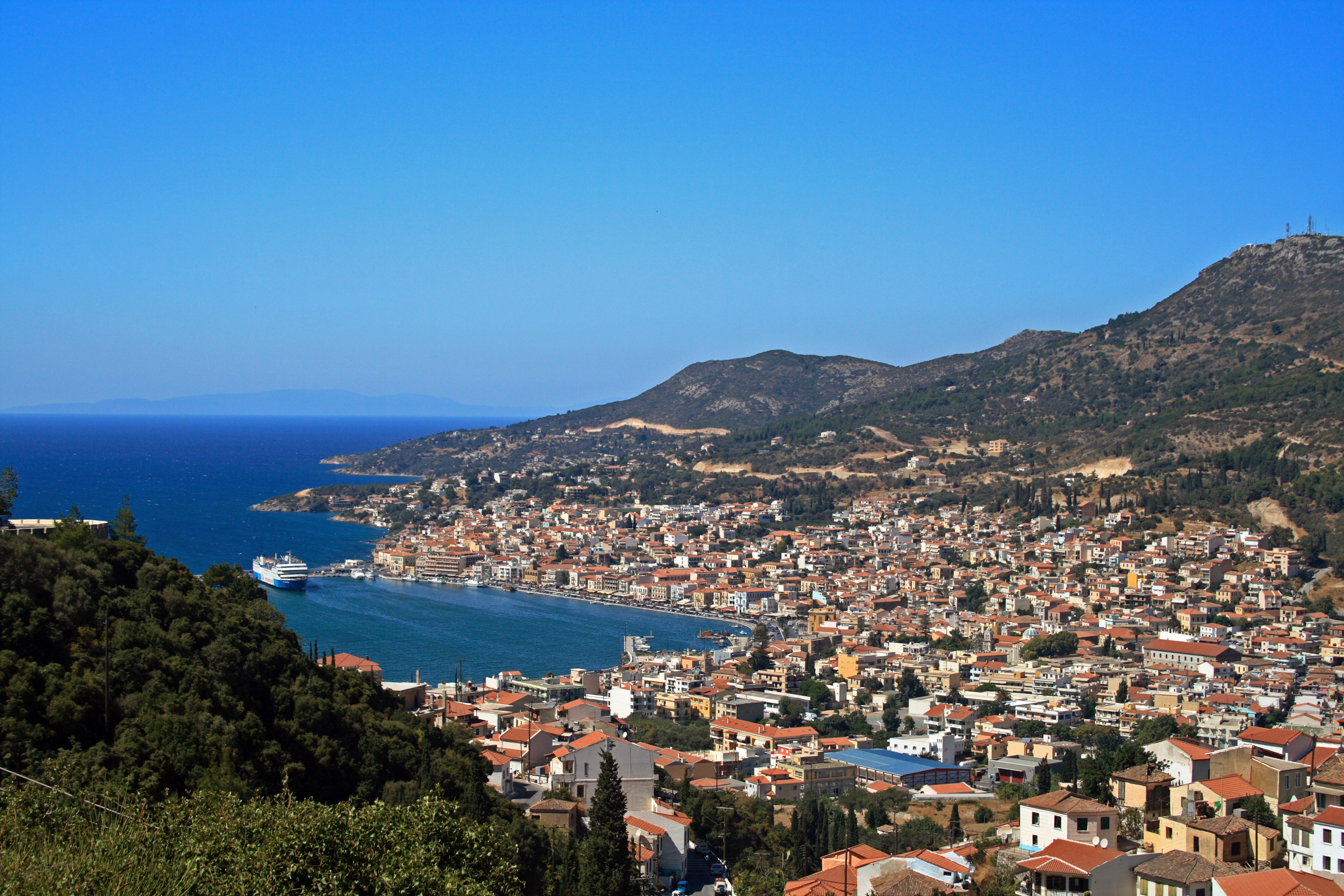
- Samos (town), capital of Samos

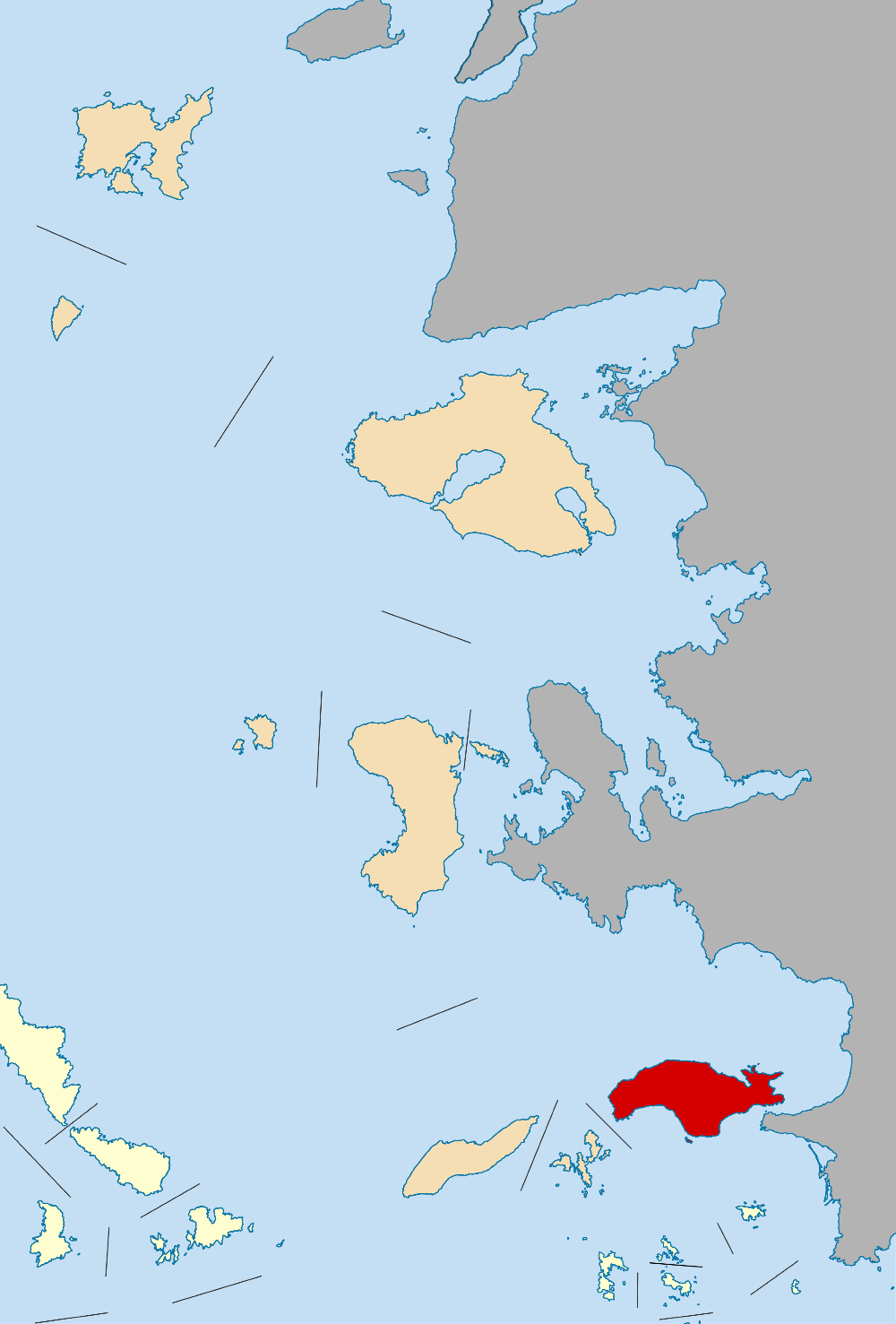
- Samos within the North Aegean

- Location within Greece
- Coordinates: 37°45′N 26°50′E
- Country: Greece
- Administrative region: North Aegean
- Seat: Samos (town)

Area
  - Total: 477.4 km^{2} (184.3 sq mi)
- Highest elevation: 1,434 m (4,705 ft)

Population (2021)
  - Total: 32,642
  - Density: 68.37/km^{2} (177.1/sq mi)
- Demonym(s): Samian, Samiot
- Time zone: UTC+2 (EET)
  - Summer (DST): UTC+3 (EEST)
- Postal code: 831 xx
- Area code: 2273
- Vehicle registration: MO
- Website: www.samos.gr

Samos (/ˈseɪmɒs/, also US: /ˈsæmoʊs, ˈsɑːmɔːs/; Greek: Σάμος, romanized: Sámos, Greek pronunciation: [ˈsa.mos]) is a Greek island in the eastern Aegean Sea, south of Chios, north of Patmos and the Dodecanese archipelago, and off the coast of western Turkey, from which it is separated by the 1.6-kilometre-wide (1.0 mi) Mycale Strait. It is also a separate regional unit of the North Aegean region.

In ancient times, Samos was an especially rich and powerful city-state, particularly known for its vineyards and wine production. It is home to Pythagoreion and the Heraion of Samos, a UNESCO World Heritage Site that includes the Eupalinian aqueduct, a marvel of ancient engineering. Samos is the birthplace of the Greek philosopher and mathematician Pythagoras, after whom the Pythagorean theorem is named, the philosophers Melissus of Samos and Epicurus, and the astronomer Aristarchus of Samos, the first known individual to propose that the Earth revolves around the Sun. Samian wine was well known in antiquity and is still produced on the island.

The island was governed by the semi-autonomous Principality of Samos under Ottoman suzerainty from 1835 until it joined Greece in March 1913.

== Etymology ==
Strabo derived the name from the Phoenician word 𐤔𐤌𐤌 (smm) 'high'.

== Geography ==
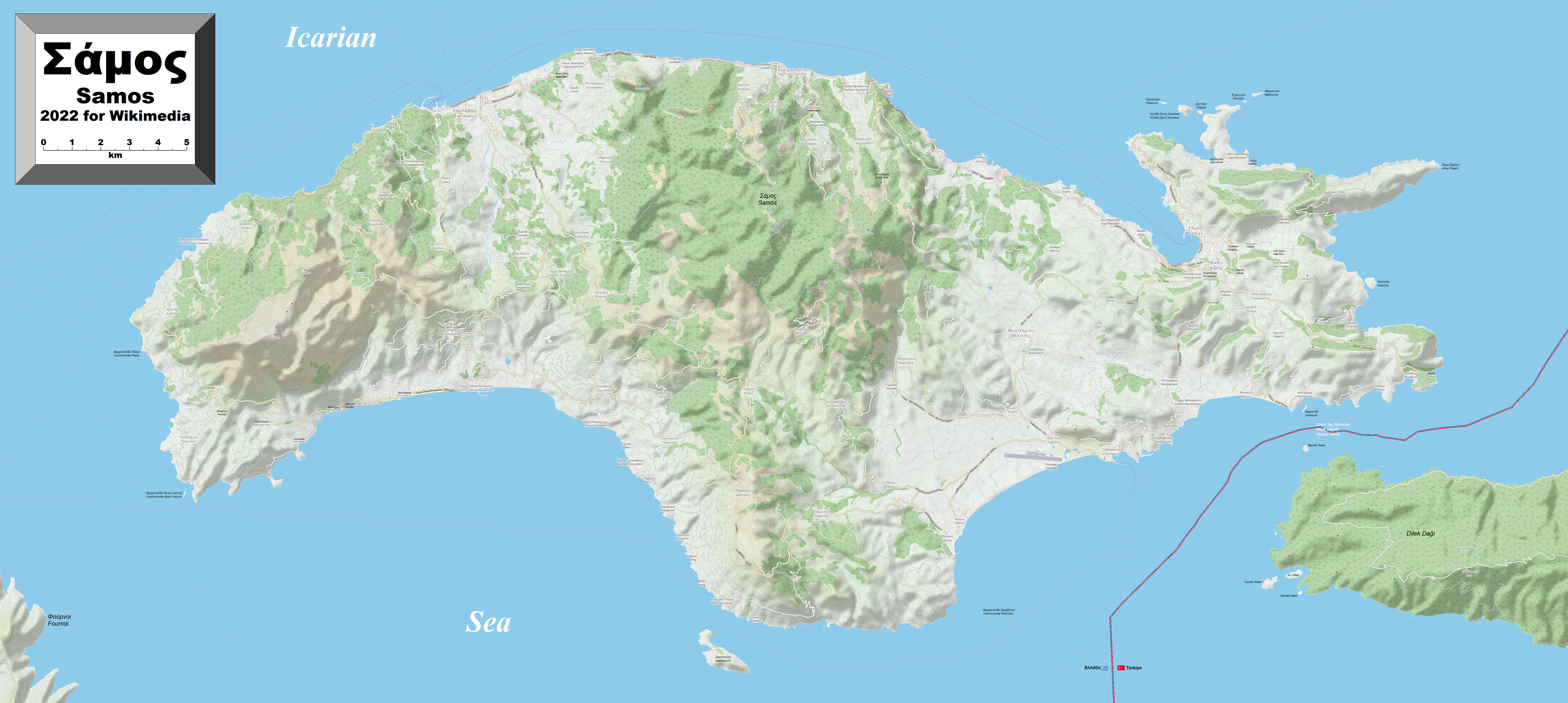
Detailed map of Samos

The area of the island is 477.395 km^{2} (184.3 sq mi), and it is 43 km (27 mi) long and 13 km (8 mi) wide. It is separated from Anatolia by the approximately 1-mile-wide (1.6 km) Mycale Strait. While largely mountainous, Samos has several relatively large and fertile plains.

A great portion of the island is covered with vineyards, from which Muscat wine is made. The most important towns other than the capital, Vathy (population 9,700), in the northeast, are those of Karlovasi (population 7,300), in the northwest, Pythagoreio, in the southeast, and Marathokampos in the southwest. The island's population is 33,814, which makes it the 9th most populous of the Greek islands. The Samian climate is typically Mediterranean, with mild rainy winters, and warm rainless summers.

Samos's relief is dominated by two large mountains, Ampelos and Kerkis (anc. Kerketeus). The Ampelos massif (colloquially referred to as "Karvounis") is the larger of the two and occupies the centre of the island, rising to 1,095 metres (3,593 ft). Mt. Kerkis, though smaller in area, is the taller of the two, and its summit is the island's highest point, at 1,434 metres (4,705 ft). The mountains are a continuation of the Mycale range on the Anatolian mainland.

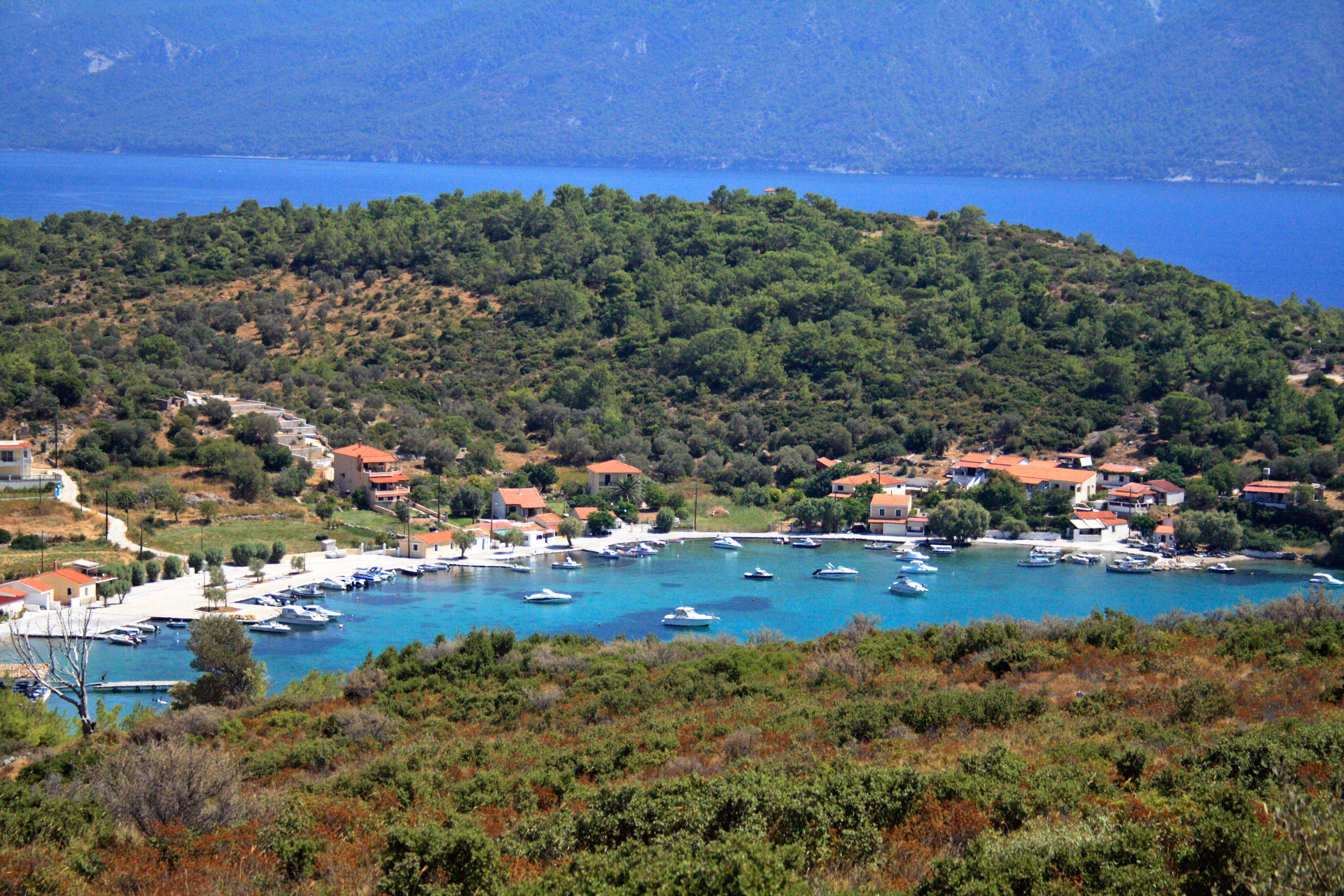
View of Poseidonio.

=== Fauna ===
Samos is home to many species including the golden jackal, stone marten, wild boar, flamingos and monk seal.

=== Climate ===
Samos has a hot-summer Mediterranean climate (Köppen climate classification: Csa), with mild, rainy winters and hot, dry summers. The highest temperature ever recorded is 43.0 °C (109.4 °F) while the lowest is −3.4 °C (25.9 °F). July is the hottest and driest month followed by August while February is the coldest month and December records the highest amount of precipitation. Samos receives about 705 millimetres (27.8 in) of rainfall annually while the average annual temperature is 18.4 °C (65.1 °F). Humidity is lowest during the summer and highest at the end of autumn.

Climate data for Samos Airport, Greece (1978-2010)
Month	Jan	Feb	Mar	Apr	May	Jun	Jul	Aug	Sep	Oct	Nov	Dec	Year
Record high °C (°F)	20.4 (68.7)	21.6 (70.9)	25.0 (77.0)	30.0 (86.0)	36.4 (97.5)	39.6 (103.3)	43.0 (109.4)	41.4 (106.5)	37.2 (99.0)	36.0 (96.8)	27.2 (81.0)	23.0 (73.4)	43.0 (109.4)
Mean daily maximum °C (°F)	13.5 (56.3)	13.5 (56.3)	15.9 (60.6)	19.7 (67.5)	24.9 (76.8)	30.1 (86.2)	33.0 (91.4)	32.8 (91.0)	28.6 (83.5)	23.5 (74.3)	18.4 (65.1)	15.0 (59.0)	22.4 (72.3)
Daily mean °C (°F)	10.3 (50.5)	10.0 (50.0)	12.1 (53.8)	15.9 (60.6)	20.6 (69.1)	25.5 (77.9)	28.4 (83.1)	27.9 (82.2)	24.3 (75.7)	19.4 (66.9)	14.5 (58.1)	11.9 (53.4)	18.4 (65.1)
Mean daily minimum °C (°F)	7.2 (45.0)	6.9 (44.4)	8.4 (47.1)	11.1 (52.0)	14.9 (58.8)	19.5 (67.1)	22.8 (73.0)	22.8 (73.0)	19.2 (66.6)	15.5 (59.9)	11.3 (52.3)	8.8 (47.8)	14.0 (57.2)
Record low °C (°F)	−2.4 (27.7)	−3.4 (25.9)	−1.0 (30.2)	2.5 (36.5)	7.4 (45.3)	8.8 (47.8)	14.8 (58.6)	16.4 (61.5)	12.2 (54.0)	7.0 (44.6)	1.0 (33.8)	−1.4 (29.5)	−3.4 (25.9)
Average precipitation mm (inches)	135.0 (5.31)	105.5 (4.15)	76.4 (3.01)	40.2 (1.58)	19.8 (0.78)	1.6 (0.06)	0.5 (0.02)	0.5 (0.02)	16 (0.6)	35.8 (1.41)	116.4 (4.58)	156.8 (6.17)	704.5 (27.69)
Average precipitation days	11.7	10.8	8.3	7.4	4.0	1.0	0.2	0.1	1.8	5.0	9.4	13.8	73.5
Average relative humidity (%)	70.6	68.8	67.5	64.3	58.6	50.4	44.2	47.2	53.5	63.1	70.1	73.1	61.0
Source 1: Hellenic National Meteorological Service (temperature and precipitation)
Source 2: NOAA (extremes), Info Climat extremes 1991-present

== History ==
=== Early and Classical antiquity ===
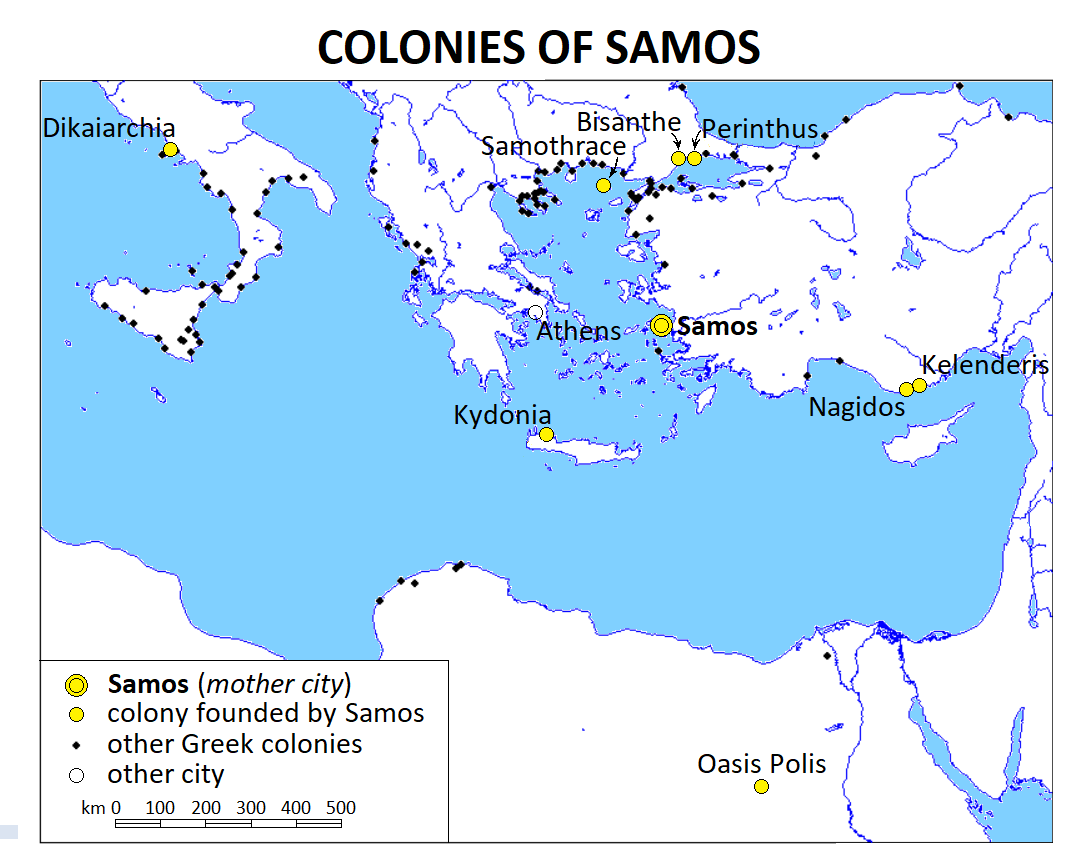
Colonies of ancient Samos

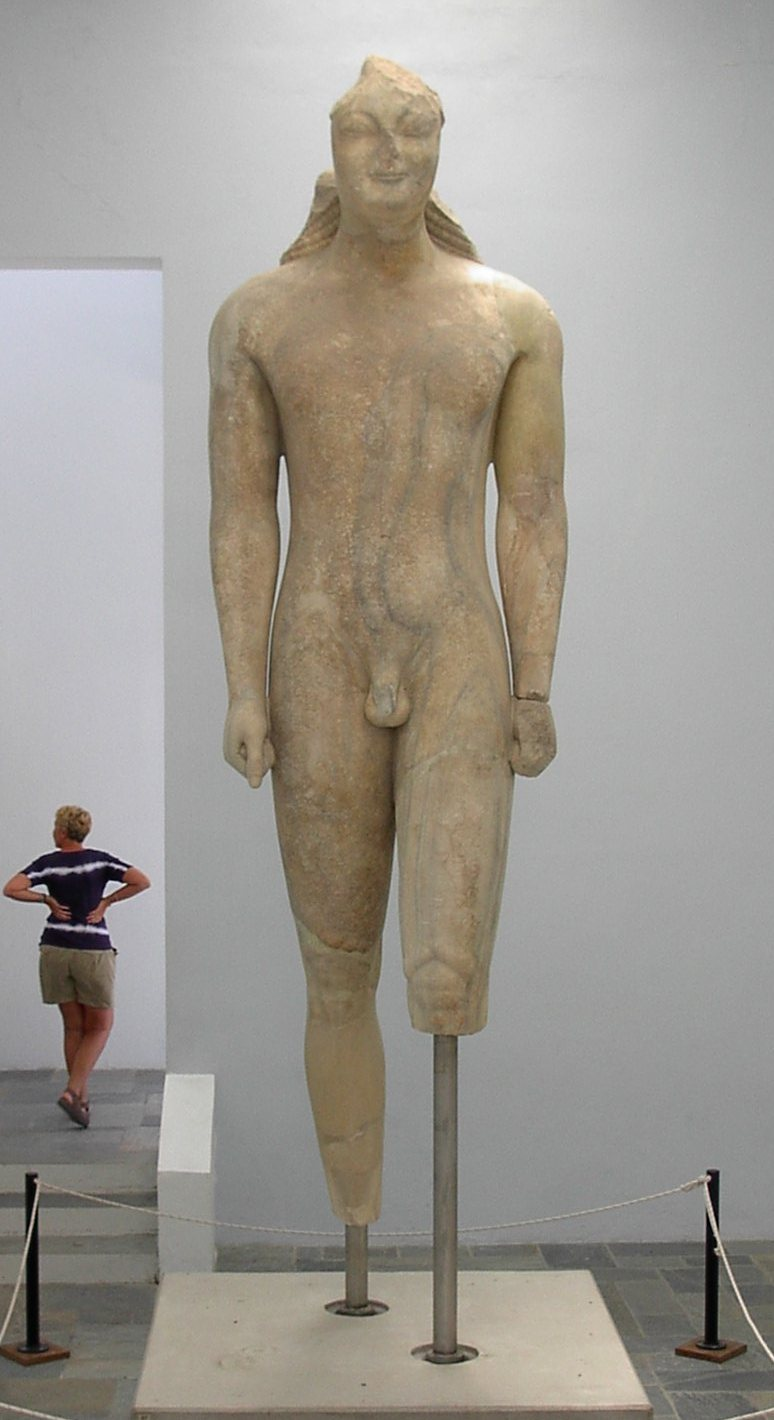
Kouros of Samos, the largest surviving Kouros in Greece, showing Egyptian influence (Archaeological Museum of Samos)

In classical antiquity, the island was a centre of Ionian culture and luxury, renowned for its Samian wines and its red pottery (called Samian ware by the Romans). Its most famous building was the Ionic order archaic Temple of goddess Hera—the Heraion.

Concerning the earliest history of Samos, literary tradition is singularly defective. At the time of the great migrations, it received an Ionian population which traced its origin to Epidaurus in Argolis: Samos became one of the twelve members of the Ionian League. By the 7th century BC, it had become one of the leading commercial centres of Greece. This early prosperity of the Samians seems largely due to the island's position near trade routes, which facilitated the import of textiles from inner Asia Minor, but the Samians also developed an extensive oversea commerce. They helped to open up trade with the population that lived around the Black Sea as well as with Egypt, Cyrene (Libya), Corinth, and Chalcis. Among the colonies the Samians founded, most of them in the sixth century BC, were Bisanthe, Perinthus, and Samothrace (northern Aegean Sea), Cydonia (Crete), Nagidos and Kelenderis (southern Anatolia), Dicaearchia (Italy), and Oasis Polis (Egypt). The trade caused them to become bitter rivals with Miletus. Samos was able to become so prominent despite the growing power of the Persian empire because of the alliance they had with the Egyptians and their powerful fleet. The Samians are also credited with having been the first Greeks to reach the Straits of Gibraltar.

The feud between Miletus and Samos broke out into open strife during the Lelantine War (7th century BC), with which a Samian innovation in Greek naval warfare may be connected, the use of the trireme. The result of this conflict was to confirm the supremacy of the Milesians in eastern waters for the time being; but in the 6th century, the insular position of Samos preserved it from those aggressions at the hands of Asiatic kings to which Miletus was henceforth exposed. About 535 BC, when the existing oligarchy was overturned by the tyrant Polycrates, Samos reached the height of its prosperity. Its navy not only protected it from invasion but also ruled supreme in Aegean waters. The city was beautified with public works, and its school of sculptors, metal-workers and engineers achieved high repute.

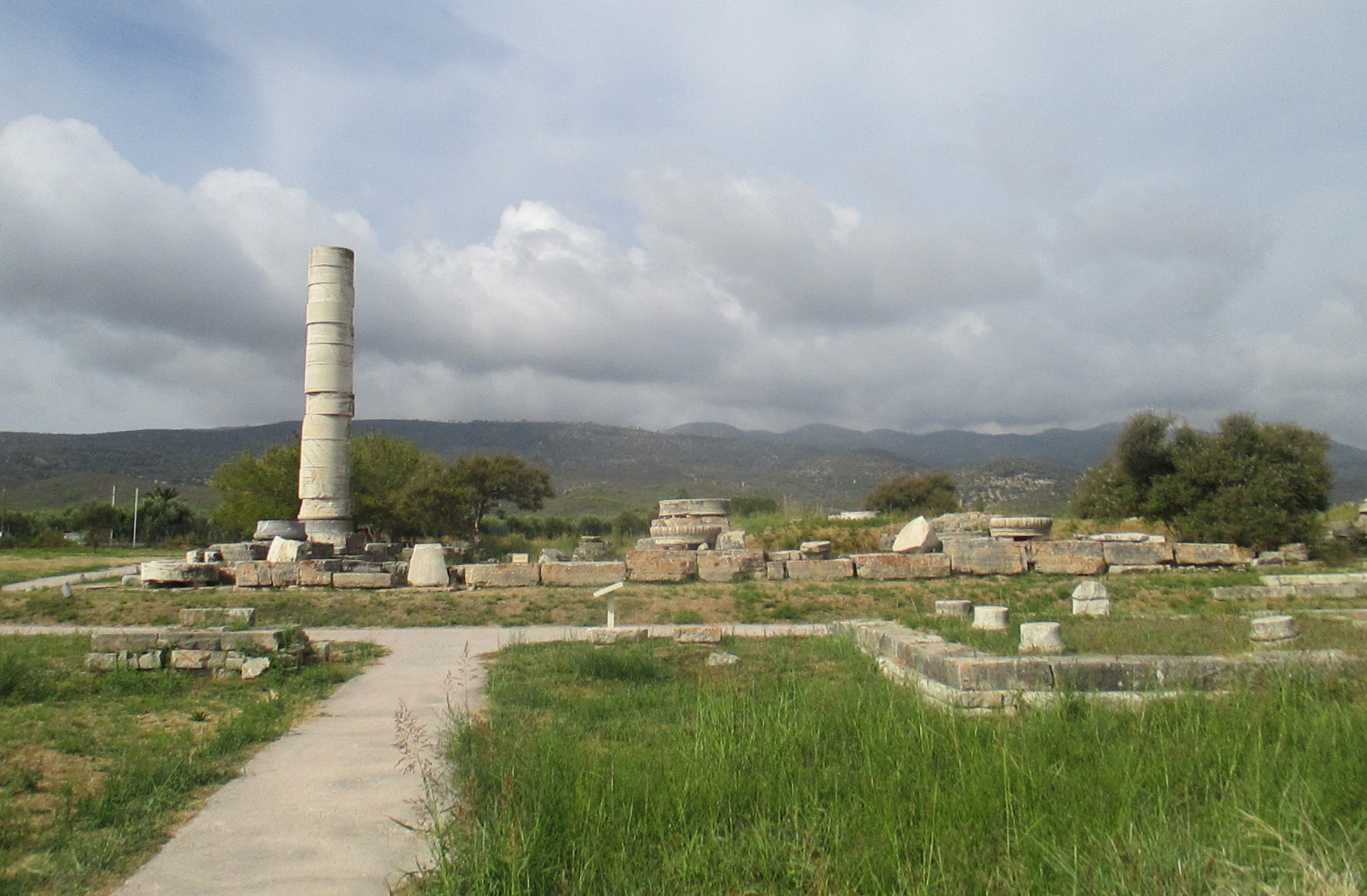
Heraion of Samos

==== Eupalinian aqueduct ====
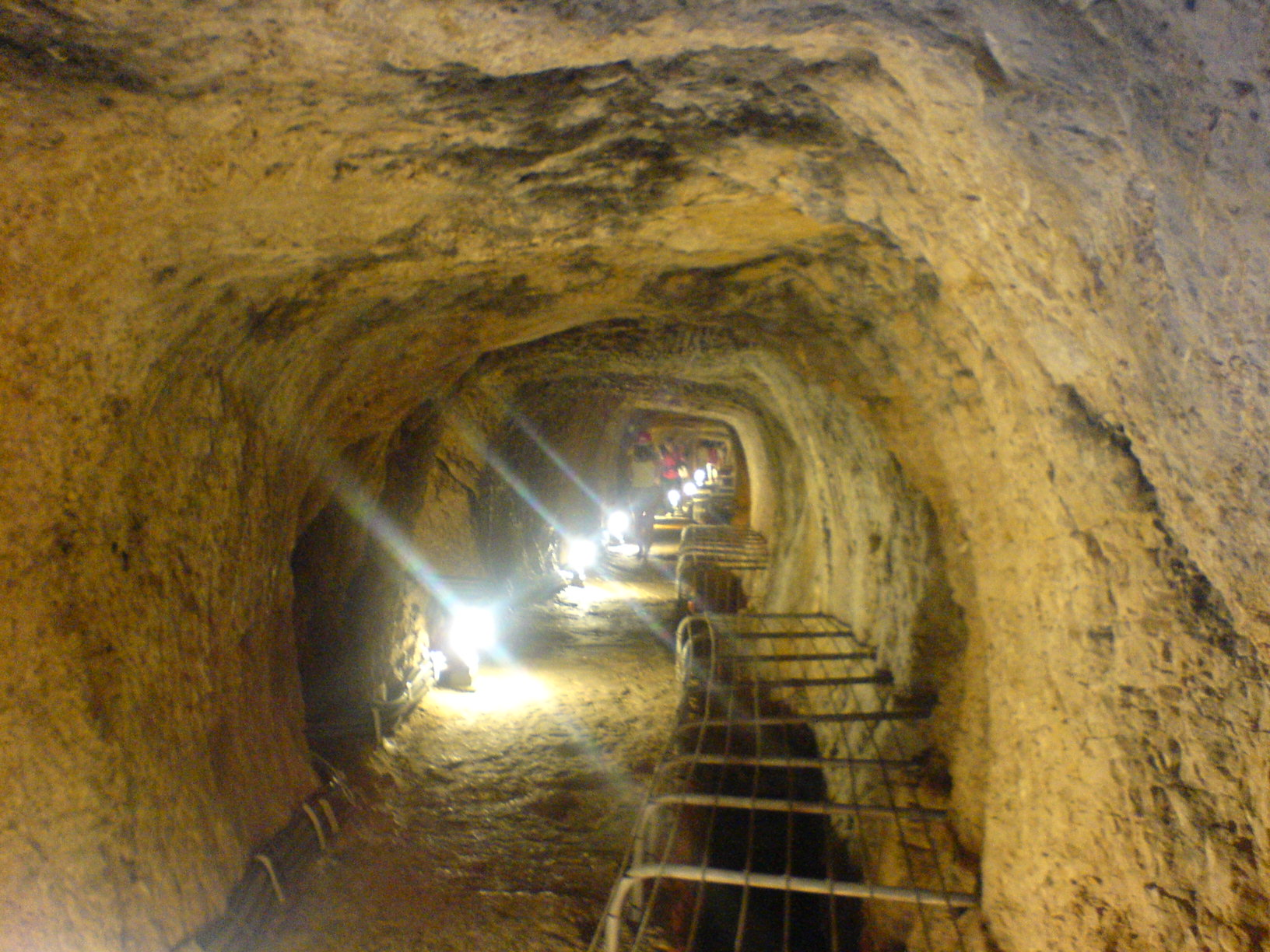
Inside the Eupalinian aqueduct

In the 6th century BC, Samos was ruled by the famous tyrant Polycrates. During his reign, two working groups under the leadership of the engineer Eupalinos dug a tunnel through Mount Kastro to build an aqueduct to supply the ancient capital of Samos with fresh water, as this was of the utmost defensive importance (since being underground, it was not easily detected by an enemy who could otherwise cut off the supply). Eupalinos's tunnel is particularly notable because it is the second earliest tunnel in history to be dug from both ends in a methodical manner. With a length of over 1 km (0.6 mi), Eupalinos's subterranean aqueduct is today regarded as one of the masterpieces of ancient engineering. The aqueduct is now part of the UNESCO World Heritage Site, the Pythagoreion.

==== Persian Wars and Persian rule ====
After Polycrates's death, Samos suffered a severe blow when the Persian Achaemenid Empire conquered and partly depopulated the island. It had regained much of its power when in 499 BC it joined the general revolt of the Ionian city-states against Persia; but owing to its long-standing jealousy of Miletus, it rendered indifferent service, and at the decisive battle of Lade (494 BC), part of its contingent of sixty ships was guilty of outright treachery. In 479BC, the Samians led the revolt against Persia, during the Battle of Mycale, which was part of the offensive by the Delian League (led by Cimon).

==== Samian War ====
In the Delian League, Samos held a position of special privilege and remained actively loyal to Athens until 440 BC, when a dispute with Miletus, which the Athenians had decided against them, induced them to secede. With a fleet of sixty ships, they held their own for some time against a large Athenian fleet led by Pericles himself, but after a protracted siege, they were forced to capitulate. Samos was punished, but Thucydides tells readers not as harshly as other states which rebelled against Athens. Most in the past had been forced to pay tribute, but Samos was only told to repay the damages that the rebellion had cost the Athenians: 1,300 talents, to pay back in instalments of 50 talents per annum.

==== Peloponnesian War ====
During the Peloponnesian War (431–404 BC), Samos took the side of Athens against Sparta, providing their port to the Athenian fleet. At the end of the Peloponnesian War, Samos appears as one of the most loyal dependencies of Athens, serving as a base for the naval war against the Peloponnesians and as a temporary home of the Athenian democracy during the revolution of the Four Hundred at Athens (411 BC), and in the last stage of the war was rewarded with the Athenian franchise. This friendly attitude towards Athens was the result of a series of political revolutions, which ended in the establishment of a democracy. After the downfall of Athens, Samos was besieged by Lysander and again placed under an oligarchy.

In 394 BC, the withdrawal of the Spartan navy induced the island to declare its independence and re-establish a democracy, but by the peace of Antalcidas (387 BC), it fell again under Persian dominion. It was recovered by the Athenians in 366 after a siege of eleven months, and received a strong body of military settlers, the cleruchs, which proved vital in the Social War (357-355 BC). After the Lamian War (322 BC), when Athens was deprived of Samos, the vicissitudes of the island can no longer be followed.

==== Famous Samians of antiquity ====
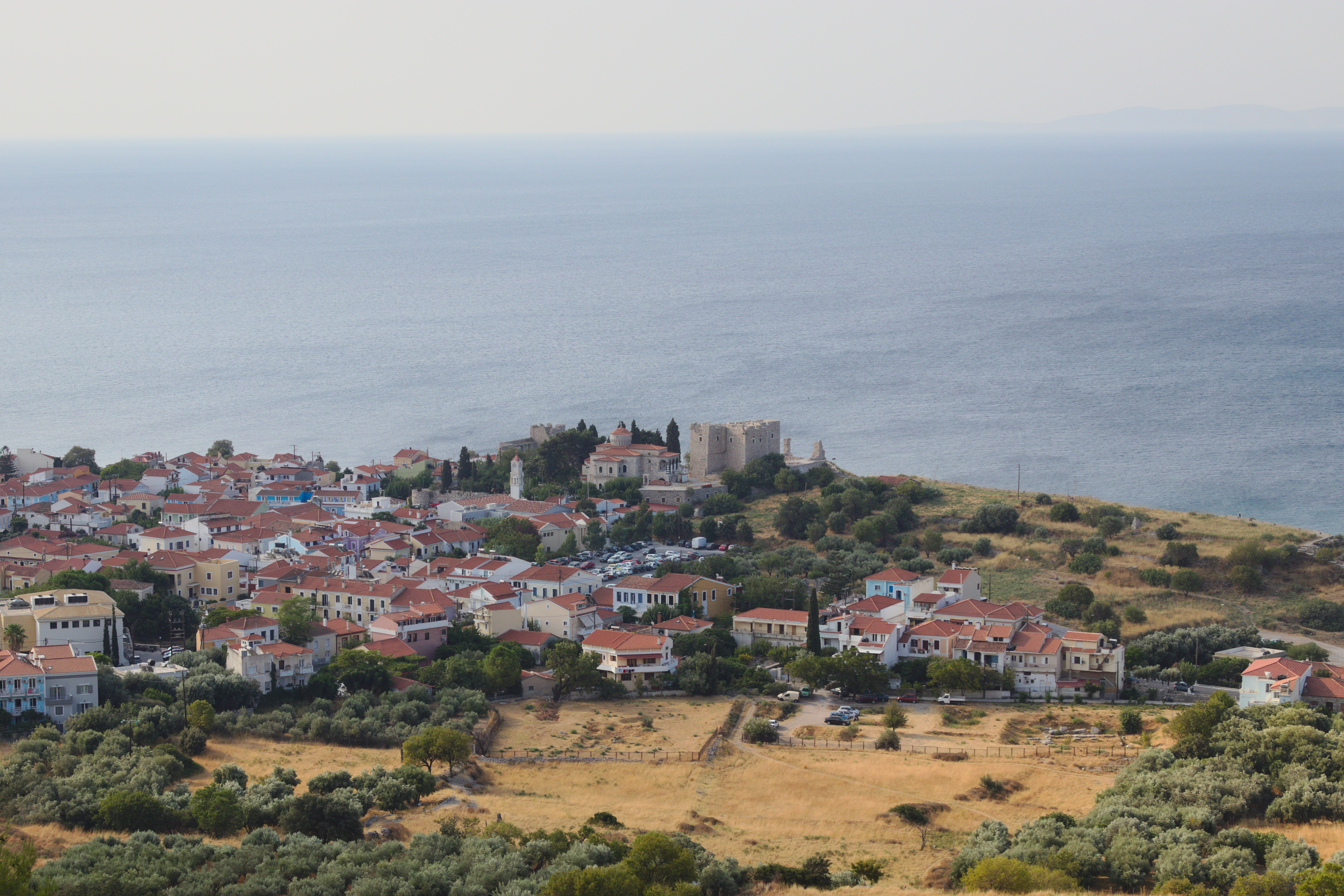
Panorama of Pythagoreion, the place of birth of Pythagoras.

Perhaps the most famous persons ever connected with classical Samos were the philosopher and mathematician Pythagoras and the fabulist Aesop. In 1955, the town of Tigani was renamed Pythagoreio in honour of the philosopher.

Other notable personalities include the philosophers Melissus of Samos and Epicurus, who were of Samian birth, and the astronomer Aristarchus of Samos, whom history credits with the first recorded heliocentric model of the Solar System. The historian Herodotus, known by his Histories, resided in Samos for a while.

There was a school of sculptors and architects that included Rhoecus, the architect of the Temple of Hera (Olympia), and the great sculptor and inventor Theodorus, who is said to have invented with Rhoecus the art of casting statues in bronze.

The vases of Samos were among the most characteristic products of Ionian pottery in the 6th century.

=== Hellenistic and Roman eras ===
For some time (about 275–270 BC), Samos served as a base for the Egyptian fleet of the Ptolemies; at other periods, it recognized the overlordship of Seleucid Syria. In 189 BC, it was transferred by the Romans to their vassal, the Attalid dynasty's Hellenistic kingdom of Pergamon, in Asia Minor.

Enrolled from 133 in the Roman province of Asia Minor, Samos sided with Aristonicus (132) and Mithridates (88) against its overlord, and consequently forfeited its autonomy, which it only temporarily recovered between the reigns of Augustus and Vespasian. Nevertheless, Samos remained comparatively flourishing and was able to contest with Smyrna and Ephesus the title "first city of lonia"; it was chiefly noted as a health resort and for the manufacture of pottery. Since Emperor Diocletian's Tetrarchy, it became part of the Provincia Insularum, in the diocese of Asiana in the eastern empire's pretorian prefecture of Oriens.

=== Byzantine and Genoese eras ===
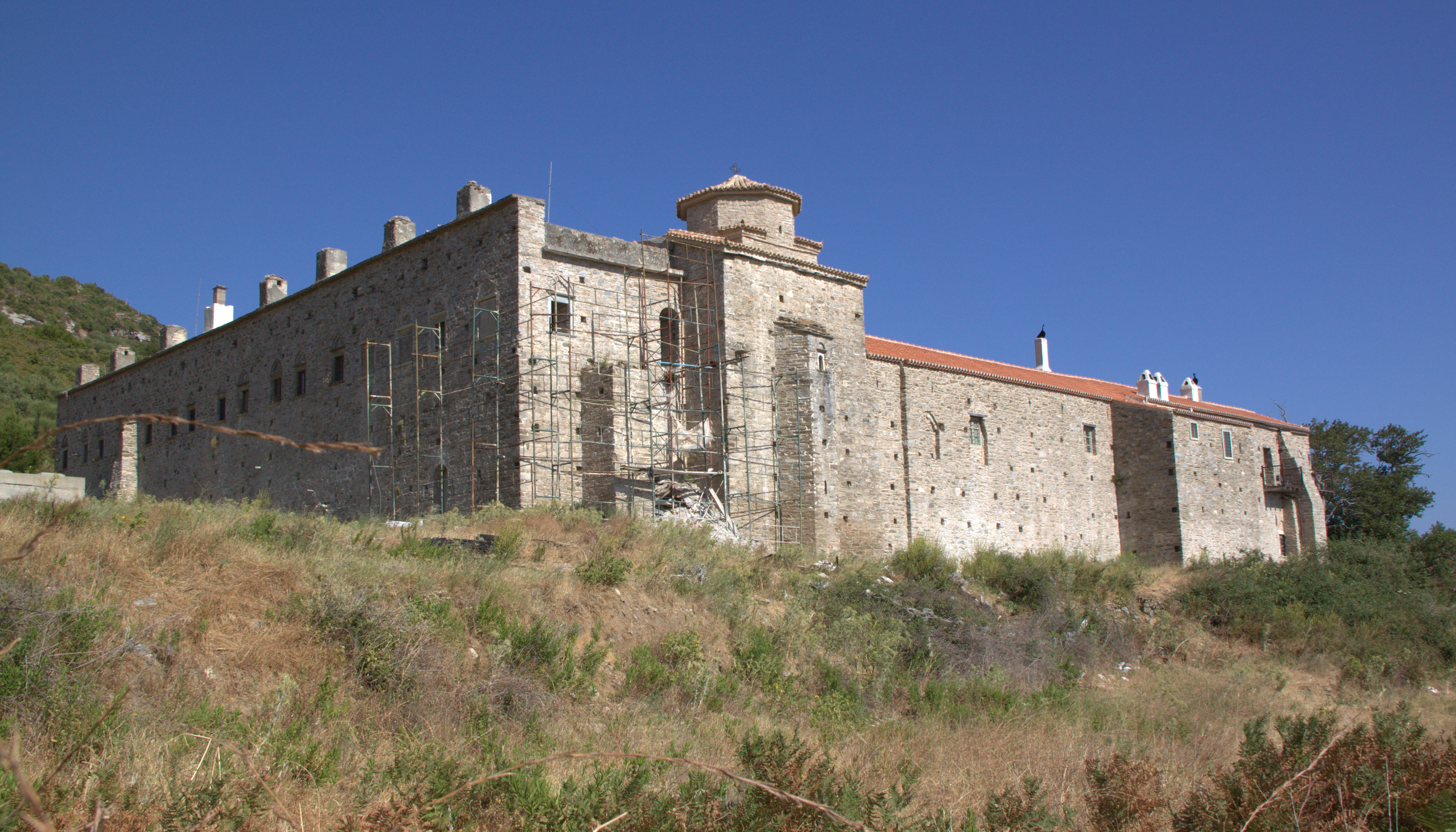
Vronta monastery

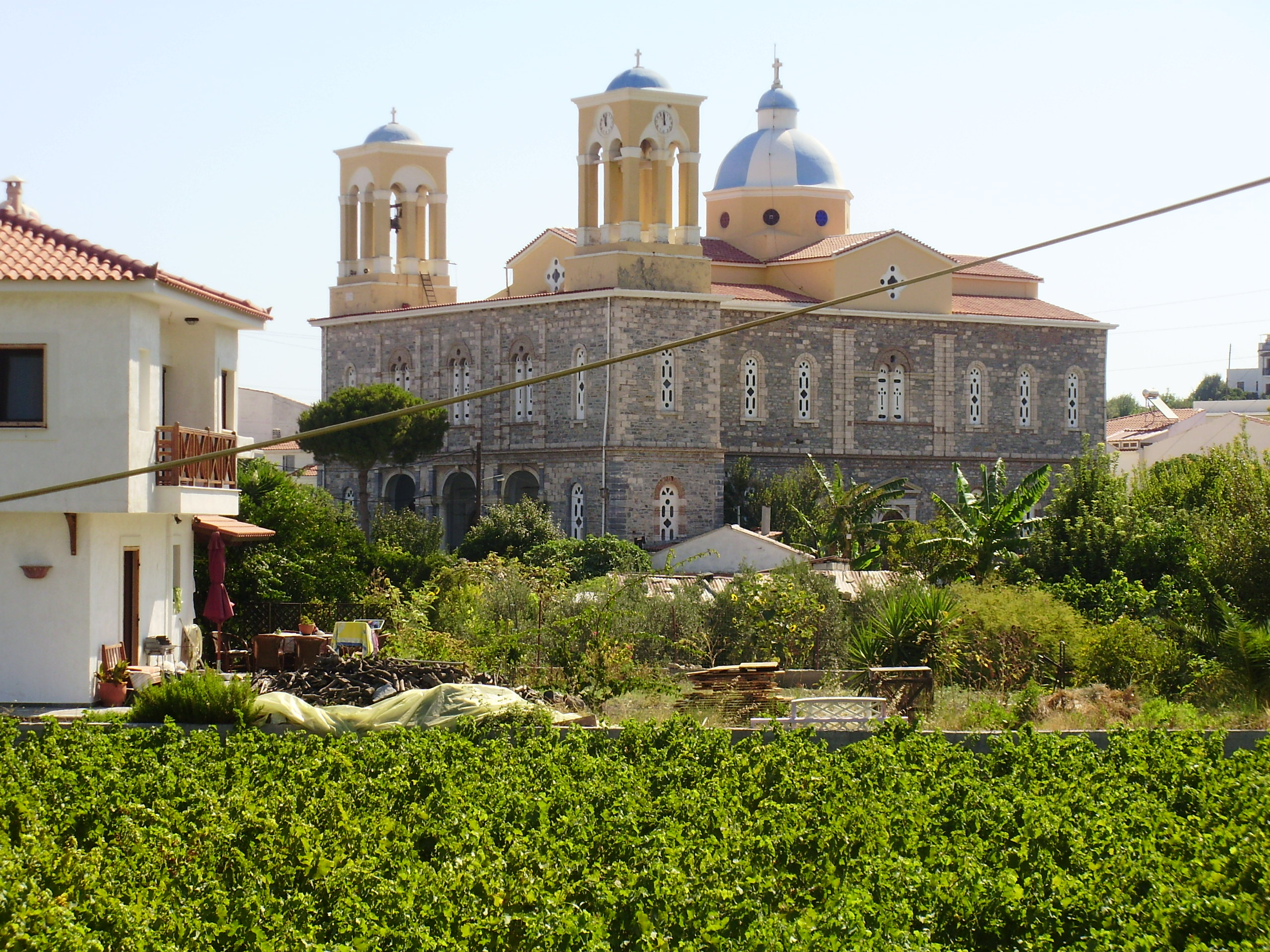
Church in Kokkari village

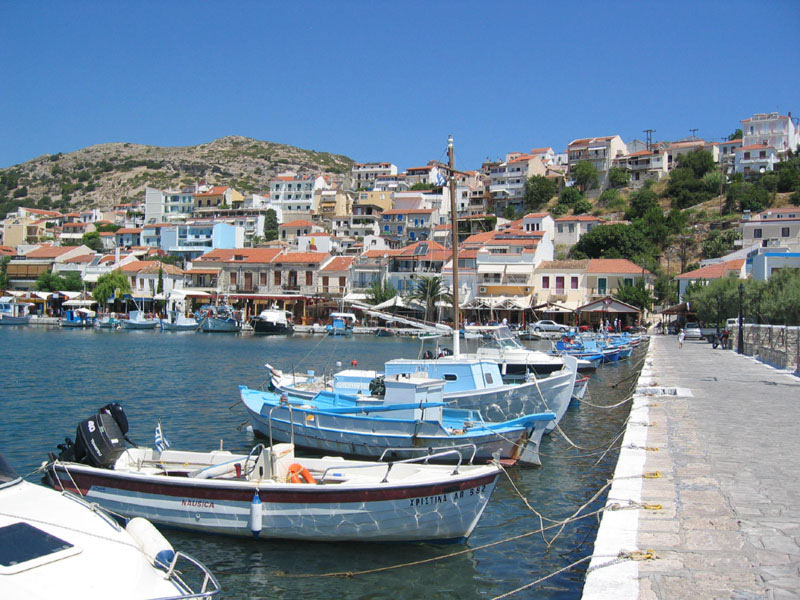
The harbour of Pythagoreion

Following the rule by Tzachas from 1081 to 1091, Samos became a namesake theme of the Byzantine Empire. After the 13th century, it passed through much the same changes of government as Chios, and likewise became property of the Genoese family Giustiniani (1346–1566; 1475 interrupted by an Ottoman period).

=== Ottoman rule ===
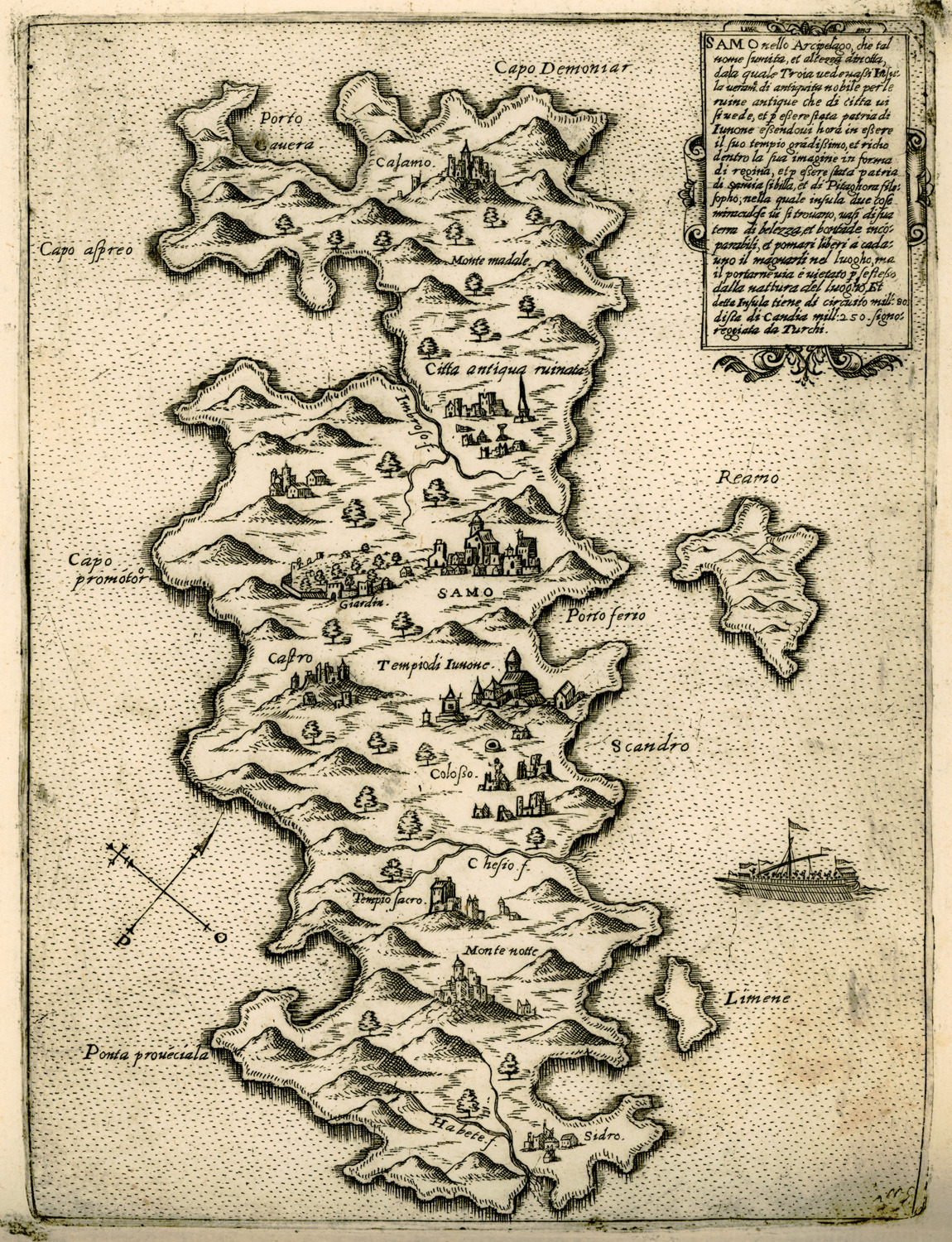
Samos map, 1574

Samos came under Ottoman rule in 1475 or c. 1479/80, at which time the island was practically abandoned due to the effects of piracy and the plague. The island remained desolate for almost a full century before the Ottoman authorities, by now in secure control of the Aegean, undertook a serious effort to repopulate the island.

In 1572/3, the island was granted as a personal domain (hass) to Kilic Ali Pasha, the Kapudan Pasha (the Ottoman Navy's chief admiral). Settlers, including Greeks and Arvanites from the Peloponnese and the Ionian Islands, as well as the descendants of the original inhabitants who had fled to Chios, were attracted through the concession of certain privileges such as a seven-year tax exemption, a permanent exemption from the tithe in exchange for a lump annual payment of 45,000 piastres, and a considerable autonomy in local affairs. The island recovered gradually, reaching a population of some 10,000 in the 17th century, which was still concentrated mostly in the interior. It was not until the mid-18th century that the coast began to be densely settled as well.

Under Ottoman rule, Samos (Ottoman Turkish: سيسام Sisam) came under the administration of the Kapudan Pasha's Eyalet of the Archipelago, usually as part of the Sanjak of Rhodes rather than as a distinct province. Locally, the Ottoman authorities were represented by a voevoda, who was in charge of the fiscal administration, the kadi (judge), the island's Orthodox bishop and four notables representing the four districts of the island (Vathy, Chora, Karlovasi and Marathokampos). Ottoman rule was interrupted during the Russo-Turkish War of 1768–1774, when the island came under Russian control in 1771–1774.

The Treaty of Küçük Kaynarca that concluded the war contained clauses that enabled a great expansion of the commercial activities of the Ottoman Empire's Greek Orthodox population. Samian merchants also took advantage of this, and an urban mercantile class based on commerce and shipping began to grow. The Samian merchants' voyages across the Mediterranean, as well as the settlement of Greeks from the Ionian Islands (which in 1797 had passed from Venice to the French Republic), introduced to Samos the progressive ideas of the Age of Enlightenment and of the French Revolution, and led to the formation of two rival political parties, the progressive-radical Karmanioloi ("Carmagnoles", named after the French Revolutionary song Carmagnole) and the reactionary Kallikantzaroi ("goblins") who represented mostly the traditional land-holding elites. Under the leadership of Lykourgos Logothetis, in 1807 the Karmanioloi gained power in the island, introducing liberal and democratic principles and empowering the local popular assembly at the expense of the land-holding notables. Their rule lasted until 1812, when they were overthrown by the Ottoman authorities and their leaders expelled from the island.

==== Greek Revolution ====
Flag of the Administration of Samos during the Greek War of Independence (1821–1830)

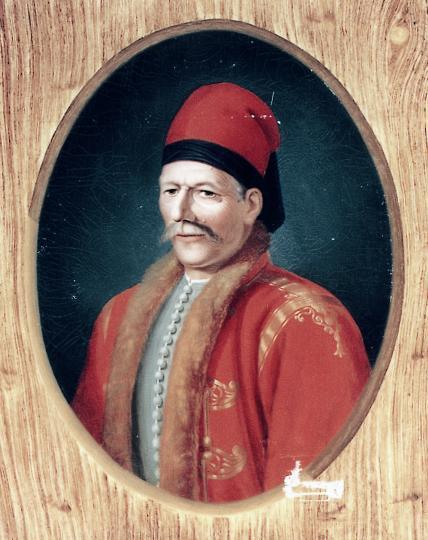
Lykourgos Logothetis, leader of the Revolution in Samos

In March 1821, the Greek War of Independence broke out, and on 18 April, under the leadership of Logothetis and the Karmanioloi, Samos too joined the uprising. In May, a revolutionary government with its own constitution was set up to administer the island, mostly inspired by Logothetis.

The Samians successfully repulsed three Ottoman attempts to recapture the island: in summer 1821, in July 1824; when Greek naval victories off Samos and at Gerontas averted the threat of an invasion, and again in summer 1826. In 1828, the island became formally incorporated into the Hellenic State under Governor Ioannis Kapodistrias, as part of the province of the Eastern Sporades, but the London Protocol of 1830 excluded Samos from the borders of the independent Greek state.

The Samians refused to accept their re-subordination to the Sultan, and Logothetis declared Samos to be an independent state, governed as before under the provisions of the 1821 constitution. Finally, due to the pressure of the Great Powers, Samos was declared an autonomous, tributary principality under Ottoman suzerainty. The Samians still refused to accept this decision until an Ottoman fleet enforced it in May 1834, forcing the revolutionary leadership and a part of the population to flee to independent Greece, where they settled near Chalkis.

==== Autonomous principality ====
Flags of the Principality of Samos

In 1834, the island of Samos became the territory of the Principality of Samos, a semi-independent state tributary to Ottoman Turkey, paying the annual sum of £2,700. It was governed by a Christian of Greek descent though nominated by the Porte, who bore the title of "Prince." The prince was assisted in his function as chief executive by a 4-member senate. These were chosen by him out of eight candidates nominated by the four districts of the island: Vathy, Chora, Marathokampos, and Karlovasi. The legislative power belonged to a chamber of 36 deputies, presided over by the Greek Orthodox Metropolitan. The seat of the government was the port of Vathý.

The modern capital of the island was, until the early 20th century, at Chora, about 2 miles (3.2 km) from the sea and from the site of the ancient city.

After reconsidering political conditions, the capital was moved to Vathy, at the head of a deep bay on the North coast. This became the residence of the prince and the seat of government. Since then, a new town has grown with a harbour.

=== Modern era ===
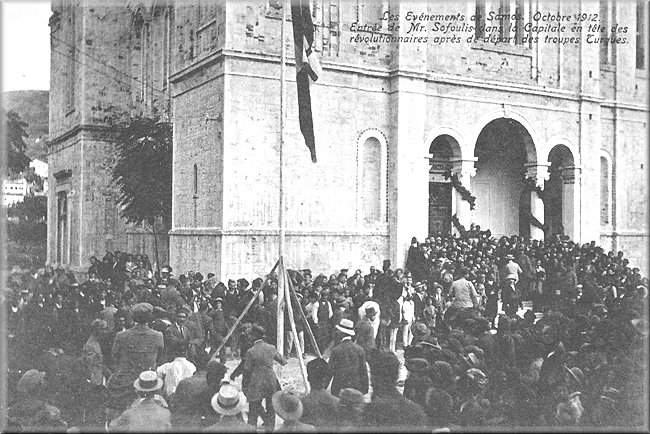
The union with the Kingdom of Greece in March 1913

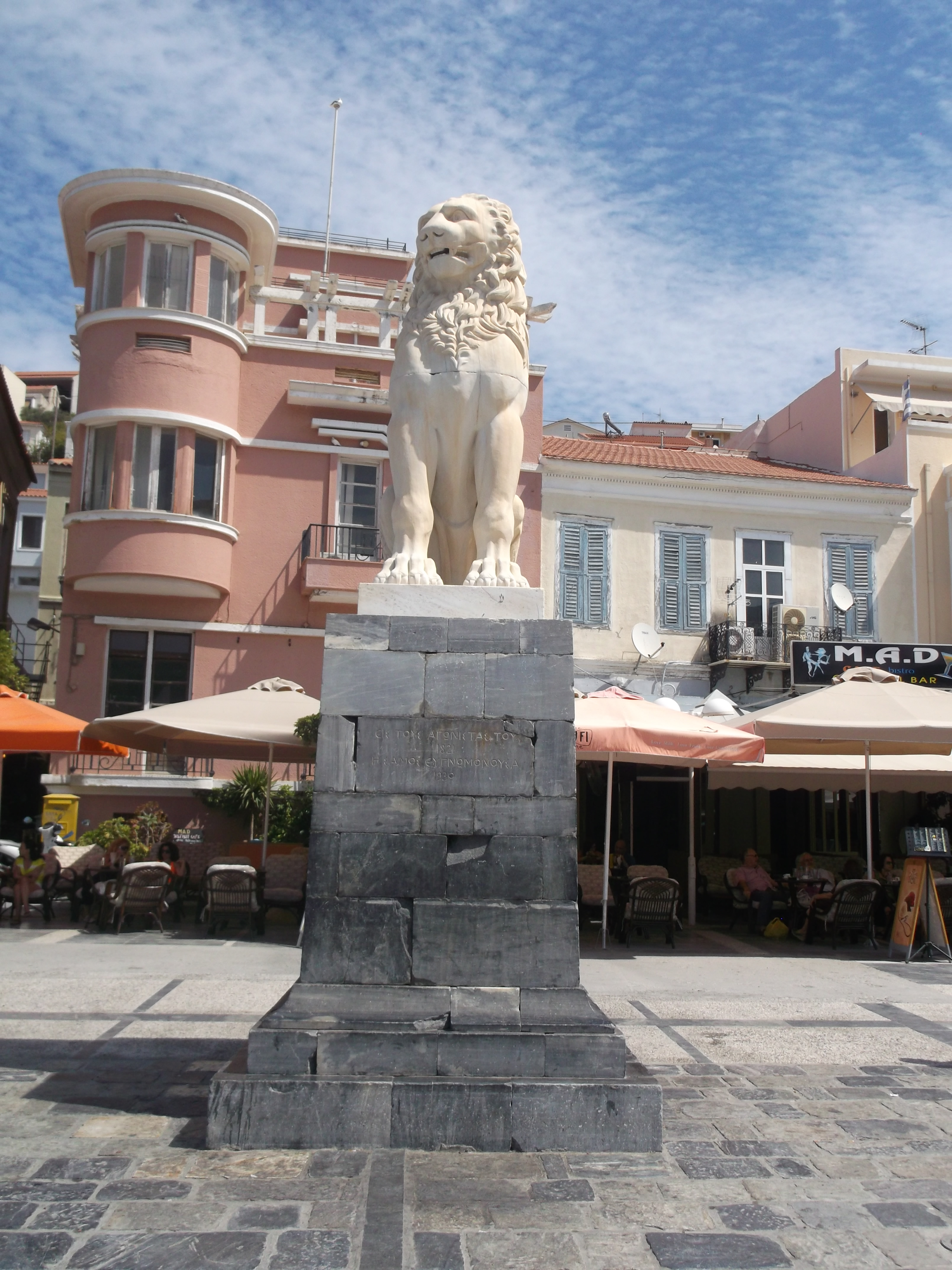
Statue of a lion in Samos town; erected in 1930 to celebrate the centenary of Greek independence.

The island was united with the Kingdom of Greece in March 1913, five months after the outbreak of the First Balkan War. Although other Aegean islands had been quickly captured by the Greek Navy, Samos was initially left to its existing status quo out of a desire not to upset the Italians in the nearby Dodecanese. The Greek fleet landed troops on the island in March 1913. The clashes with the Ottoman garrison were short-lived as the Ottomans withdrew to the Anatolian mainland, so that the island was securely in Greek hands by 16 March.

King George II visited Samos in 1937 during the 4th of August Regime.

During World War II, the island was occupied by the Italians in May 1941, with the 6th Infantry Division "Cuneo" being stationed on the island. During the winter of 1941–42 Samos was affected by the Great Famine which killed 2,000 Samiots and forced thousands more to flee the island for the Middle East. In December 1942, local communists founded a branch of ELAS resistance organisation, the following month the resistance came into contact with the British military who provided them with material support. In spring 1943, the Cuneo Division launched an unsuccessful, two-month-long counter-insurgency operation in Karvouni. In June 1943, ELAS came into contact with the anti-fascist organisation within the Cuneo Division resulting in an unofficial two-month truce between the two sides. After the Fall of the Fascist regime in Italy on 25 July, Pietro Badoglio replaced division commander Mario Soldarelli with Lieutenant General Pierola and reinforced the Samos garrison with 1,500 Blackshirts. Pierola then launched another counter-insurgency operation in Kerkis, which resulted in the death of 40 resistance members. Following the Italian surrender in September 1943, the Cuneo Division joined forces with ELAS in arresting local collaborationists and freeing jailed resistance fighters. Samos was briefly taken over by the Sacred Band and British forces, but following the Allied defeat in the Battle of Leros and a fierce aerial bombardment of Vathy and Tigani, the island was abandoned by most of the ELAS members, the anti-fascist Italians and the Allied troops and taken over by Germans without a fight. The Germans then destroyed the harbours of Karlovasos and Ormos Marathokampos with explosives. On 15 September 1944, an Allied aerial bombardment destroyed the German ship "Aslan" along with three support ships in the Vathy harbour. Upon the departure of the Germans, ELAS and a 120-man unit of the Sacred Band forced the remaining 1,000 Blackshirts to surrender; ending the island's occupation on 5 October 1944.

Many of the Samiot ELAS members that abandoned the island following its occupation by the Germans, enlisted in the Greek Armed Forces in the Middle East, participated in the communist-led 1944 Greek naval mutiny and were subsequently imprisoned in British prison camps. Approximately 4,500 of them returned to the island after the end of the war. The anti-communist persecutions that came in the aftermath of the Treaty of Varkiza led many former ELAS members to create self-defence militias which gradually evolved into the Samos branch of the Democratic Army of Greece (DSE). The Samiot DSE drew manpower from nearby Icaria which was a notable place of internal exile for Greek communists, it was also able to capture large quantities of weapons and ammunition abandoned by the Italians during World War II. During the course of the Greek Civil War, Samos became one of the biggest centres of DSE resistance outside of the Greek mainland. The last DSE unit surrendered in Kerkis on 26 August 1949, the defeat of the communist resistance was followed by a celebratory visit of the Greek royal family on 15 October 1949. A total of 197 Samiot DSE fighters were killed during the course of the civil war.

On August 3, 1989, a Short 330 aircraft of the Olympic Airways (now Olympic Airlines) crashed near Samos Airport; 31 passengers and the crew died.

A substantial migrant camp has been developed on the island at the site of a Greek military camp at Vathy to cope with the influx of migrants crossing the strait between the island and the Turkish mainland. It is estimated that in April 2020 the Vathy camp held 6,800 migrants, ten times the number it was originally designed for. The presence of large numbers of migrants on the Greek islands has caused tensions and some civil unrest on the part of island residents and migrants being kept in camps. In 2020, the Greek government announced a new closed reception centre will be built near the village of Zervou to replace the current temporary open camps by 2021.

On 30 October 2020, a magnitude 7.0 earthquake struck offshore near the island, triggering a tsunami. The earthquake and tsunami resulted in two deaths and several injured in Samos, and 117 deaths and 1632 injured in Turkey. The earthquake also caused damage to a number of buildings in Vathy, Karlovasi, and their vicinities; these included residential buildings, public buildings (schools, halls, etc.), religious buildings (churches), the tower of Lykourgos Logothetis, as well as pottery collections and sculptures at some museums.

== Government ==
Samos is a separate regional unit of the North Aegean region, and since 2019 it consists of two municipalities: East Samos and West Samos. Between the 2011 Kallikratis government reform and 2019, there was one single municipality on the island: Samos, created out of the 4 former municipalities on the island. At the same reform, the regional unit Samos was created out of part of the former Samos Prefecture.

The municipality of East Samos consists of the following municipal units (former municipalities):

- Pythagoreio
- Vathy

The municipality of West Samos consists of the following municipal units:

- Karlovasi
- Marathokampos

Samos has a sister town called Samo, which is located in Calabria, Italy.

=== Province ===
The province of Samos (Greek: Επαρχία Σάμου) was one of the provinces of the Samos Prefecture. It had the same territory as the present regional unit. It was abolished in 2006.

== Economy ==
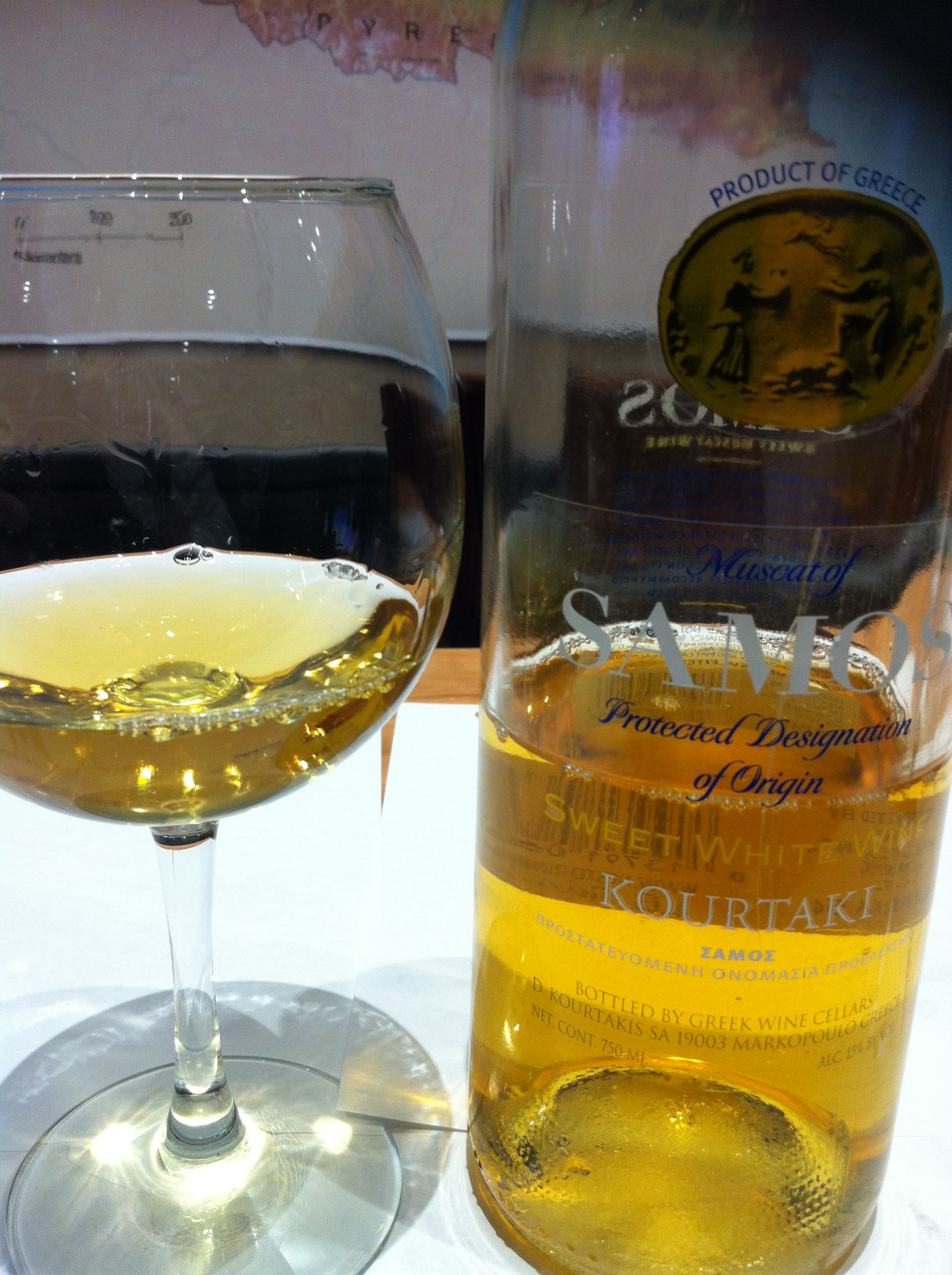
Muscat of Samos

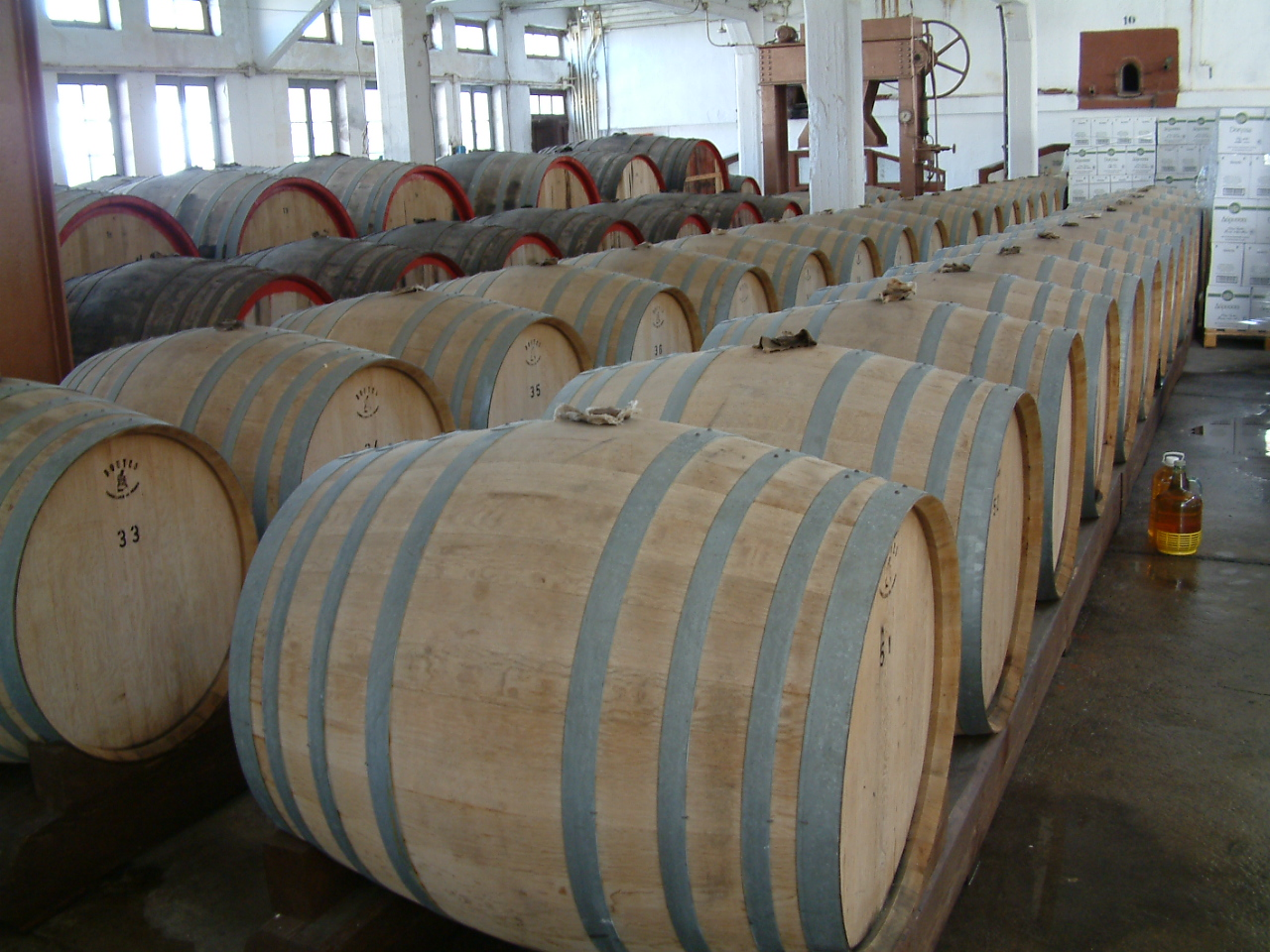
Samian wine

The Samian economy depends mainly on agriculture and the tourist industry which was growing steadily since the early 1980s and reached a peak at the end of the 1990s. The main agricultural products include grapes, honey, olives, olive oil, citrus fruit, dried figs, almonds and flowers. The Muscat grape is the main crop used for wine production. Samian wine is also exported under several other appellations.

In 2026, the European Investment Bank approved financing to connect the northeast Aegean islands to the Greek electricity grid.

=== Cuisine ===
Local specialities:

- Bourekia (Börek)
- Katimeria
- Armogalo cheese
- Katádes (dessert)
- Moustalevria (dessert)
- Muscat of Samos (wine)
- Tiganites (pancakes)

=== Transport ===
There are two main ferry terminals, at Samos and Karlovasi: the two towns are connected by the EO62 national road, which runs along the northern coast between the two towns. The island is also served by 13 numbered provincial roads, of the 15 created in 1956 for the then-existing Samos Prefecture.

Samos International Airport is the main regional airport of the island, providing seasonal flights to Europe: it is accessible by Provincial Road 1 from Karlovasi or Vathy.

== UNESCO ==
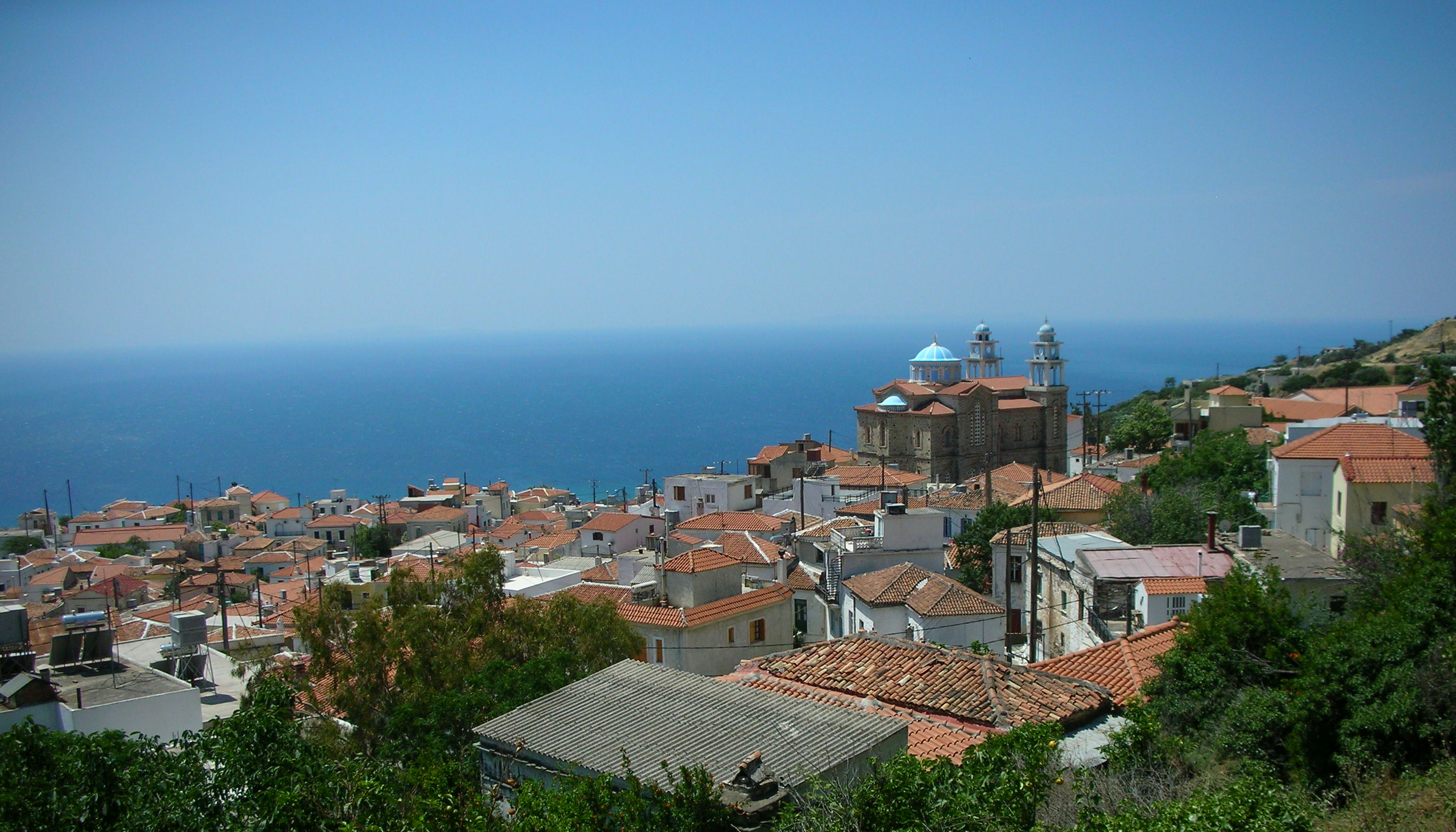
View of Marathokampos village

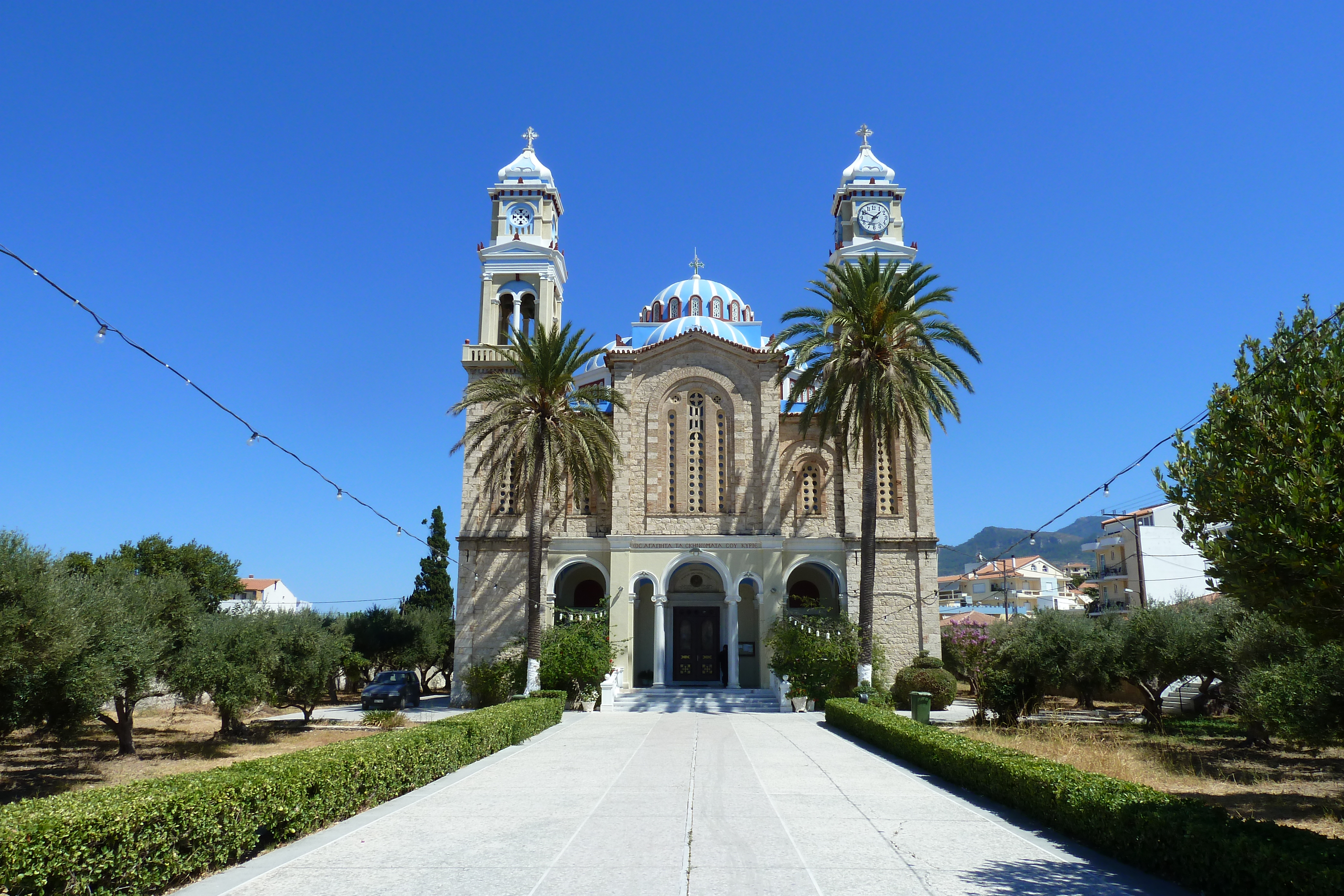
Agios Nikolaos Church, Karlovasi

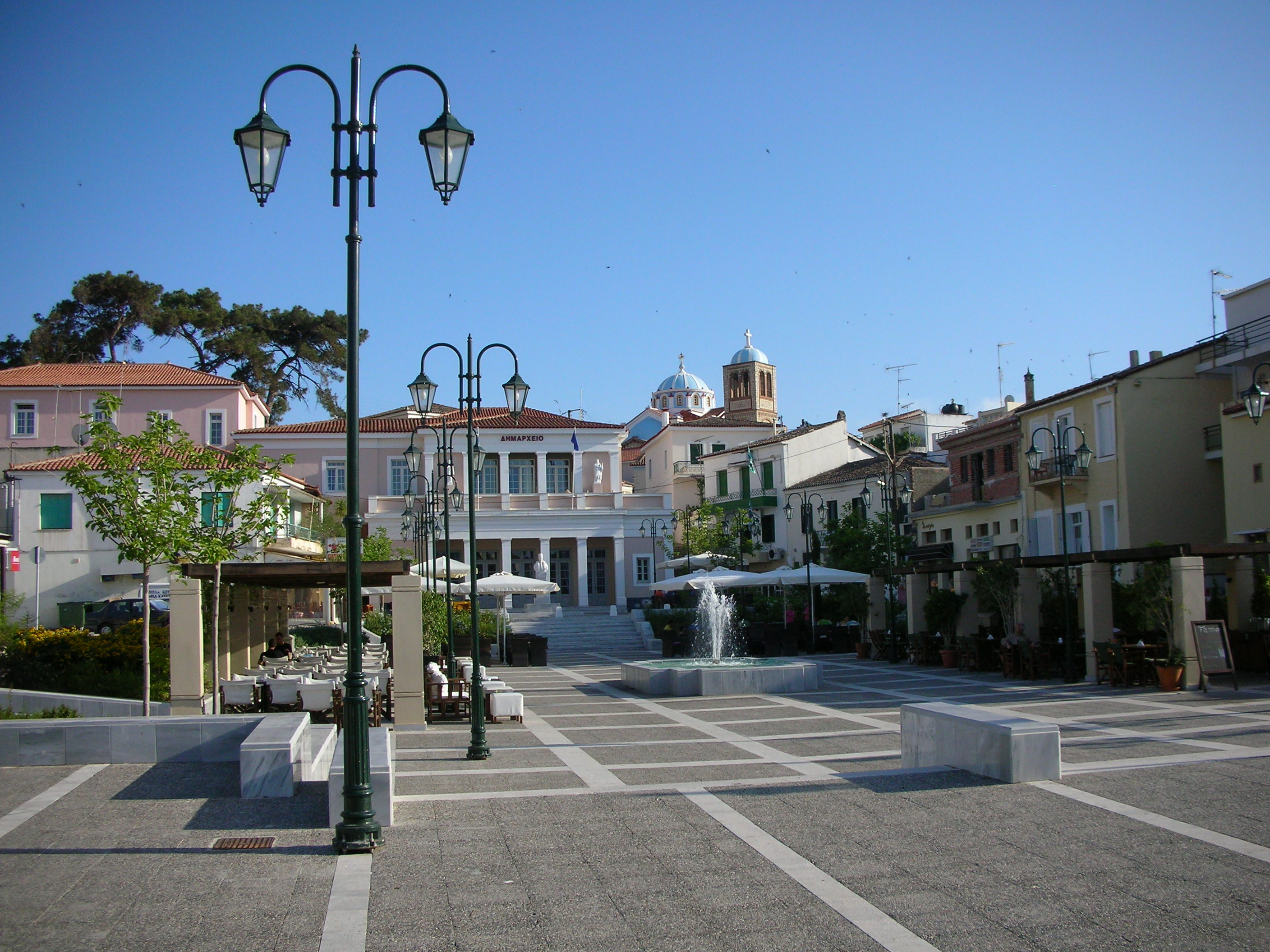
Picture of the town of Karlovasi

The island is the location of the joint UNESCO World Heritage Sites of the Heraion of Samos and the Pythagoreion which were inscribed in UNESCO's World Heritage list in 1992.

== Notable people ==
=== Ancient ===
- Aegles, athlete
- Aeschrion of Samos, poet
- Aesop, storyteller
- Aethlius (writer)
- Agatharchus, painter
- Agathocles (writer)
- Aristarchus of Samos (3rd century BC), astronomer and mathematician, the first known individual to propose that the Earth revolves around the Sun.
- Asclepiades of Samos, epigrammist and poet
- Asius of Samos, poet
- Conon of Samos, astronomer and mathematician
- Creophylus of Samos, legendary singer
- Duris of Samos (4th-3rd century BC), historian
- Epicurus (4th century BC), philosopher, founder of the Epicurean school of philosophy
- Melissus of Samos, philosopher
- Nicaenetus of Samos, poet
- Philaenis (4th-3rd century BC), courtesan and writer
- Polycrates (6th century BC), tyrant of Samos
- Pythagoras (6th century BC), philosopher, mathematician, and religious leader, after whom the Pythagorean theorem is named.
- Telauges, philosopher
- Pythagoras (sculptor)
- Rhoecus (6th century BC), sculptor
- Telesarchus of Samos (6th century BC), aristocrat
- Theodorus (6th century BC), sculptor and architect
- Theon of Samos, painter

=== Modern ===
- Lykourgos Logothetis (1772–1850), leader of the Samians during the revolution of 1821
- Ion Ghica (1816–1897), Romanian revolutionary, mathematician, diplomat, prime minister of Romania, first president of the Romanian Academy, prince of Samos
- Themistoklis Sofoulis (1860–1949), politician, Prime Minister of Greece
- Kostas Roukounas (1903–1984), singer of Rebetika
- Nikos Stavridis (1910–1987), actor
- Nerses Ounanian (1924–1957), Armenian-Uruguayan sculptor
- Nikolaos Margioris (1913–1993), Greek esoteric philosopher
- Anna Perivolaris (c. 1888 – 1963), teacher of Greek culture in Australia
- Patrick Dimon (1946–2025), singer

== Gallery ==
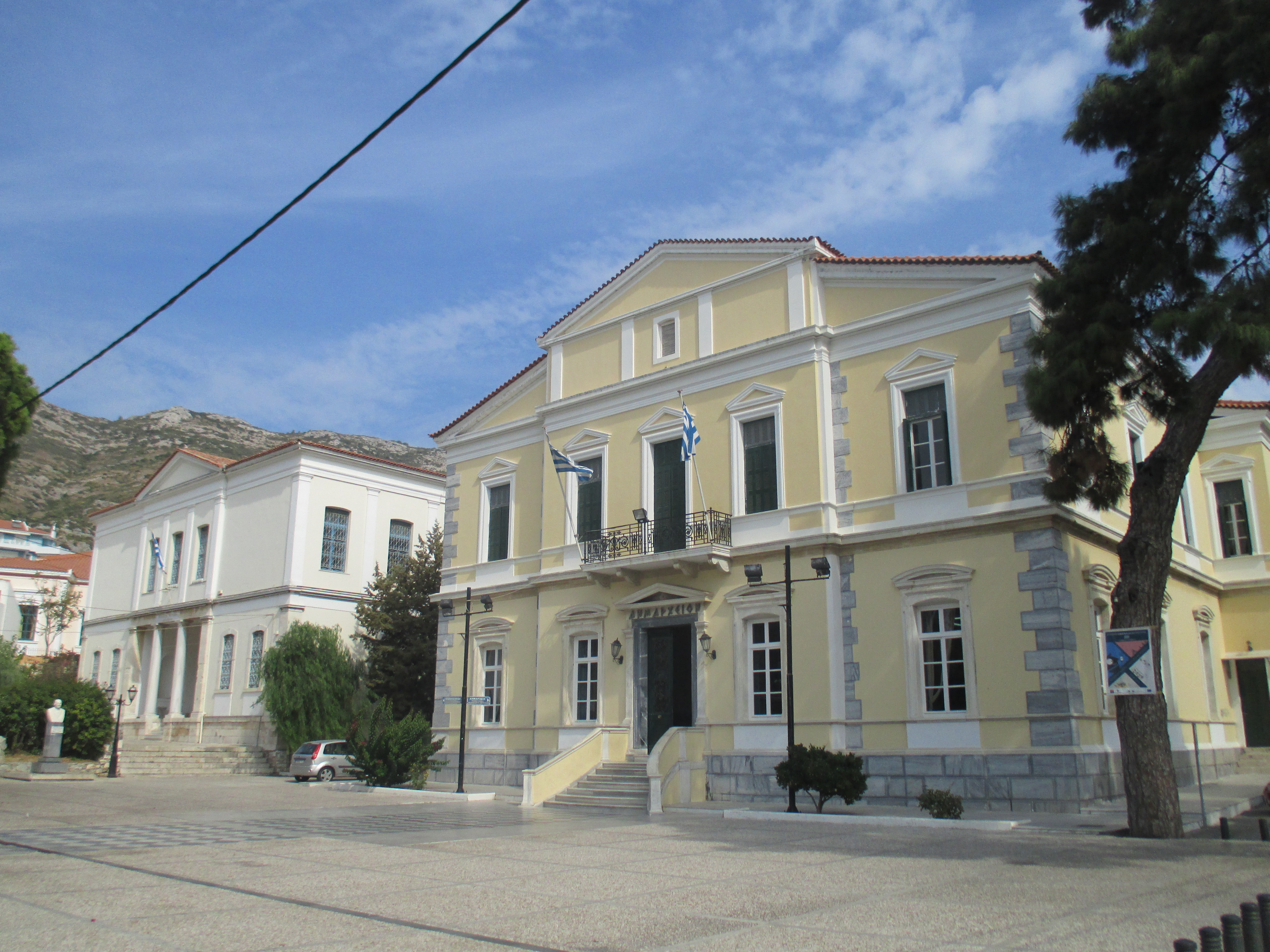
The town hall and the archaeological museum in Vathy

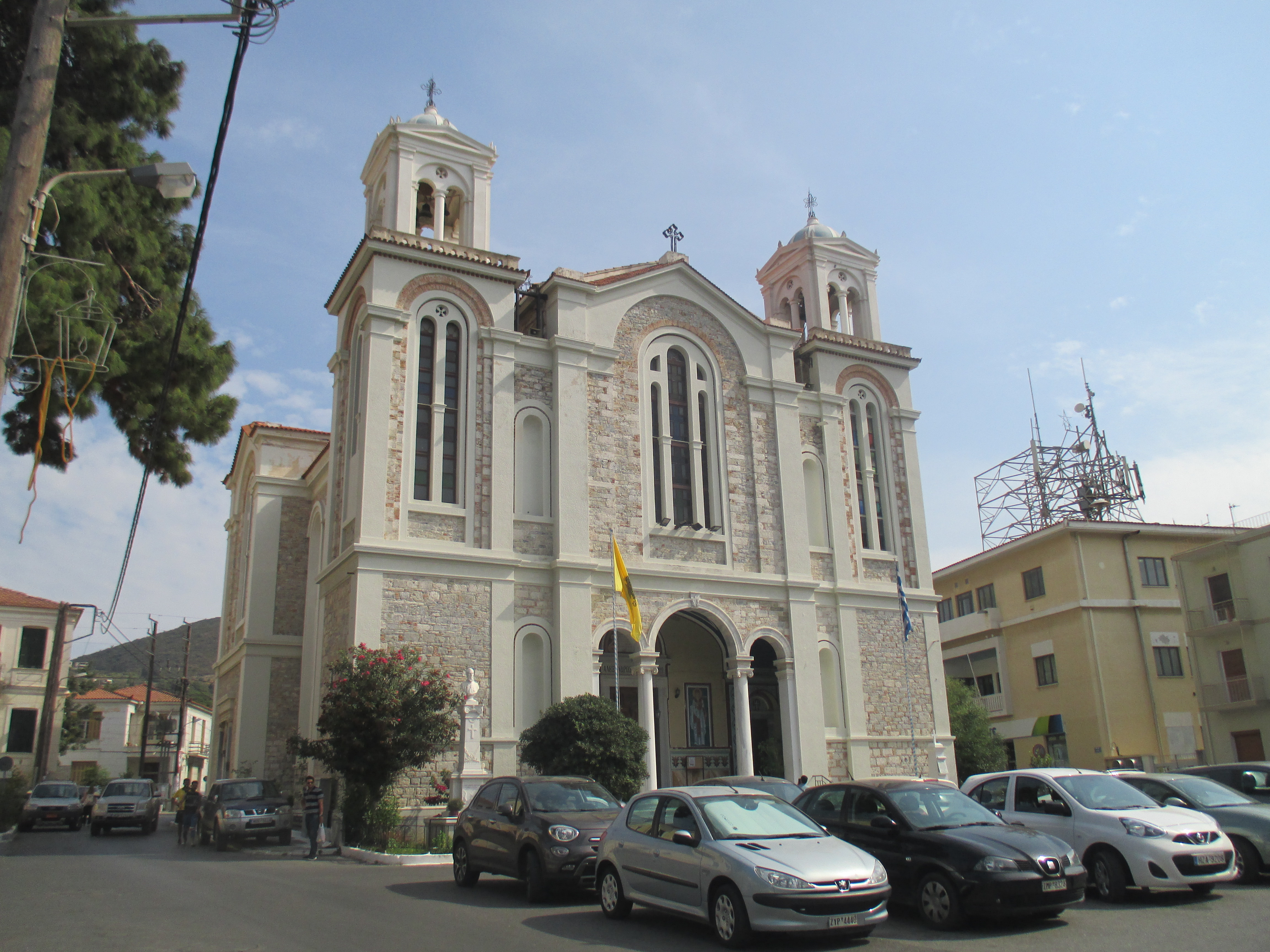
St Spyridon, Samos town

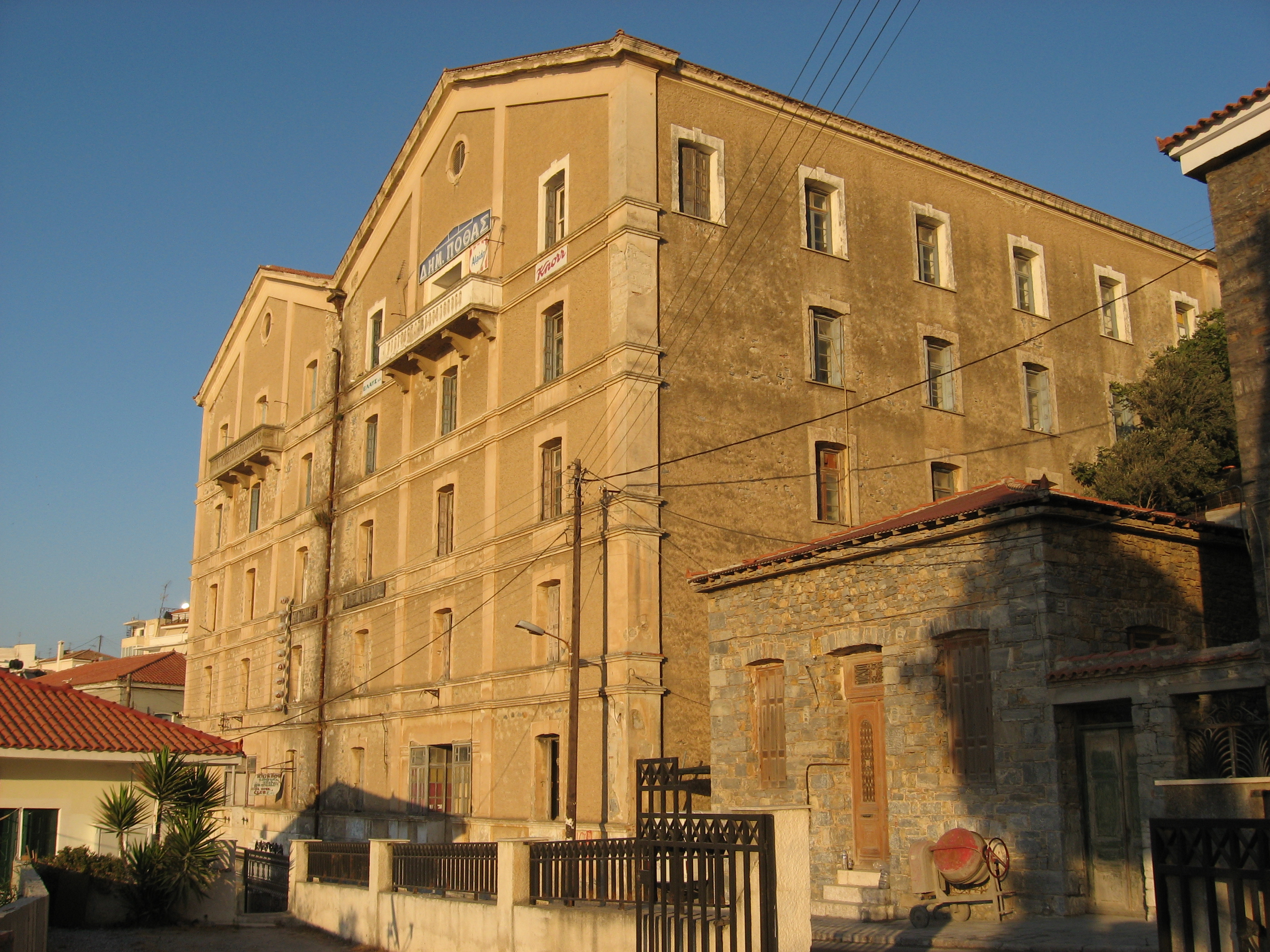
Old tobacco factory, Samos town

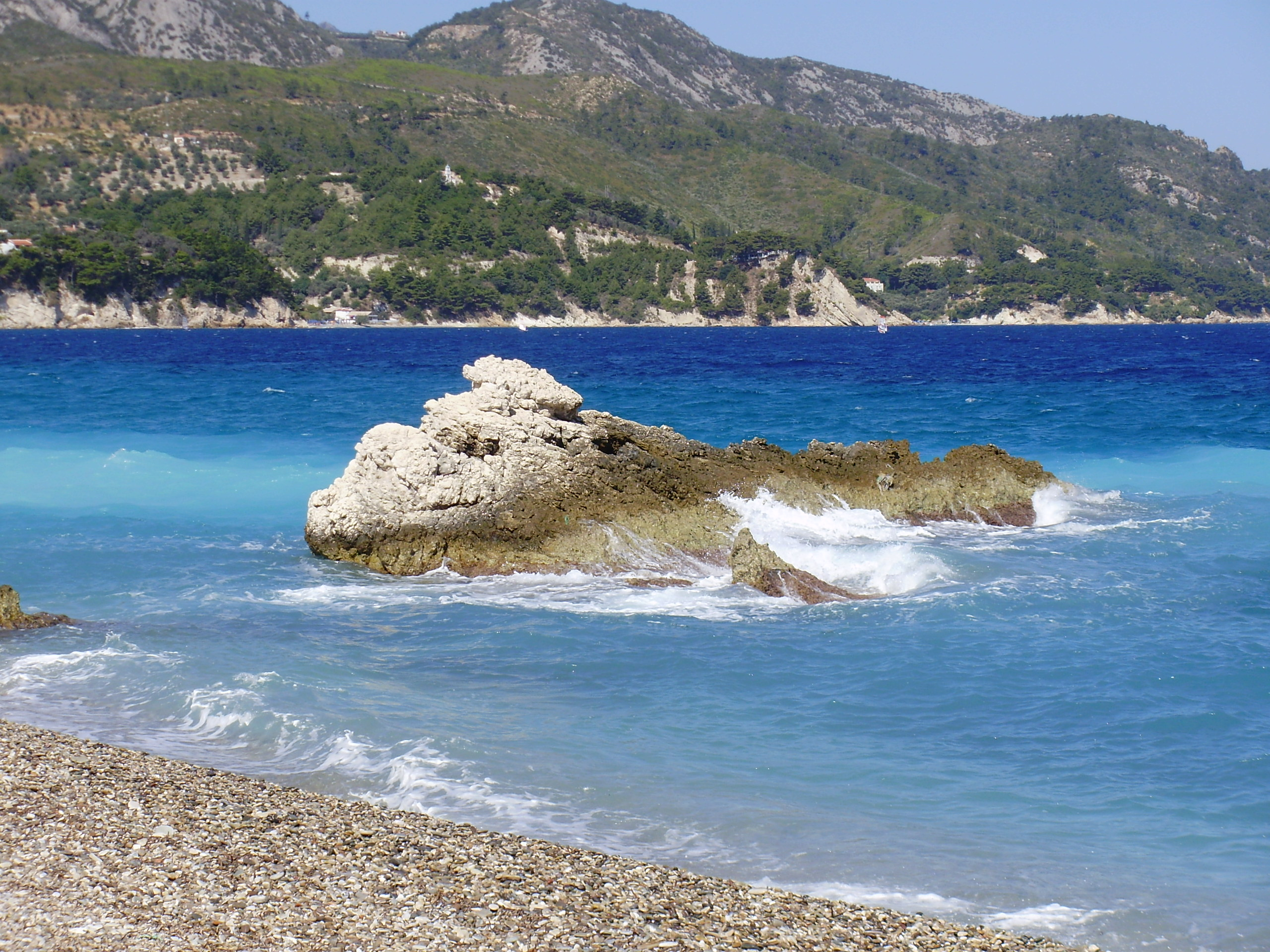
Kokkari beach

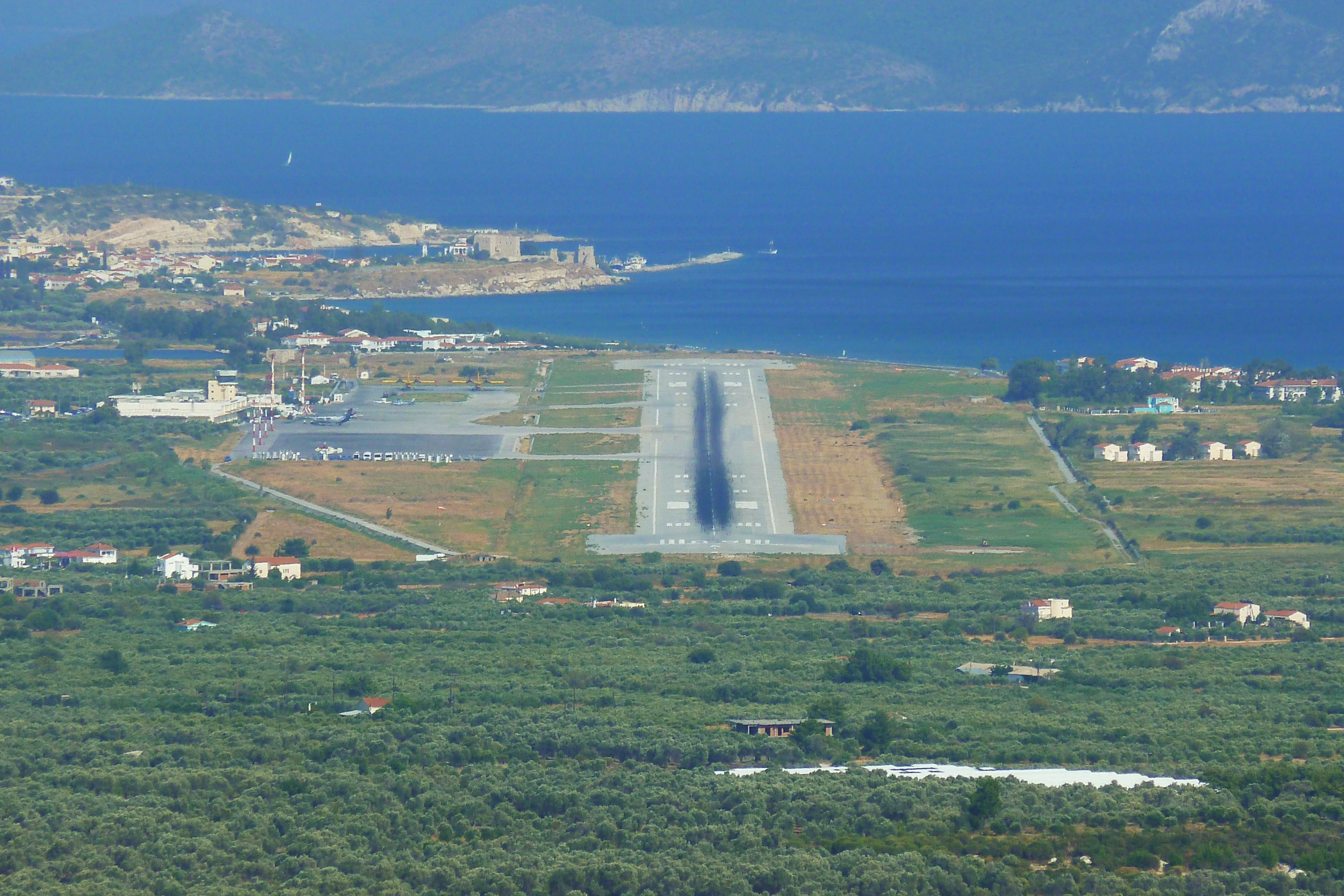
Samos International Airport

== See also ==
- 1904 Samos earthquake
- Xenophon
- Ancient regions of Anatolia
