= Telesarchus of Samos =

6th-century BC Greek aristocrat

In The Histories of Herodotus, Telesarchus (Greek: Τελέσαρχος, Telesarkhos) was a 6th-century BC aristocrat who played a role in the political upheavals of Samos during its conquest by Darius and the Persians.

== A story of power struggles ==
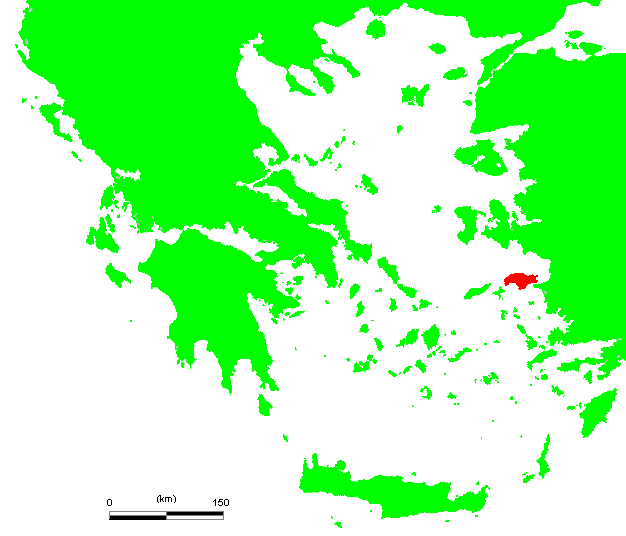
Samos, highlighted in red

After the tyrant Polycrates was killed, following talks with the Persians, his secretary Maeandrius seized power over Samos but attempted to restore a democratic form of government (ἰσονομίη, "rule of equals"). Telesarchus, representing the aristocratic faction, asserted that Maeandrius was "not fit to rule" and accused him of fiscal impropriety. To silence his criticism, Maeandrius arrested him. Nothing further was heard from Telesarchus, but the confrontation caused Maeandrius to become aware of and fear an opposition movement. He arrested a number of aristocrats on suspicion, abandoned his efforts toward democratic reform, and resolved to hold power as a tyrant: "Telesarchus' contemptuous refusal of democracy thus produces exactly what it endeavours to prevent: the rule of Maeandrius."

The opinion that Telesarchus had of Maeandrius may have been unwarranted; Herodotus said that Maeandrius's intention was "to become the most righteous of men," and Telesarchus's characterization of him as a scoundrel (ὄλεθρος, 3.142.5) was contradicted by his actions up to that point. At the same time, neither man had a clear view of what the political situation required in the face of the Persian threat. Maeandrius appeared to be more interested in asserting himself as the liberator of Samos than in actually securing liberty. In its examination of the complex dynamics and psychology of power, the account in Herodotus can be read as "one of his many political essays."

The story is replete with political irony. Despite Maeandrius's efforts to impose order, the political dispute left the Samians too disorganized to resist the Persians. When the Samian aristocrats opposed Maeandrius and his offer to become their liberator, they were arrested and subsequently killed; Herodotus remarked dryly that "apparently they did not want to be free." The Persians who conquered the island were led by Otanes, a champion of democracy, who nevertheless placed Samos under the tyrannical rule of Syloson, brother of Polycrates and a traitor to his fellow Samians. It is possible that Telesarchus is a composite created by Herodotus to represent a point of view; his name can be translated as "End-Rule."

== A political fable ==
Marcel Detienne, a specialist in the anthropological approach to Greek culture, writing with Jesper Svenbro, used the story of Maeandrius and Telesarchus in conjunction with Aesopic fable to explore the theme of "the wolf longing for the city," summarizing the account in Herodotus as:

The industrious private citizen, shaking his mane, denounces the fine legislator who grants himself privileges while announcing the happy arrival of the equal distribution of goods.

In his opposition, Telesarchus seems to have recognized the paradox of "wolf turned lawgiver," the appropriation of power through appearing to offer its redistribution, but his aristocratic status caused him to attack Maeandrius on the basis of his inferior birth.

== Sources ==
- Herodotus, Histories 3.142–143; for translation by Robin Waterfield, see Herodotus: The Histories (Oxford University Press, 1998), pp. 228–229 online.
