= Aethlius (writer) =

Ancient Greek writer

Aethlius (Ancient Greek: Ἀέθλιος) of Samos was the author of a work titled Samian Annals (Ὧροι Σάμιοι), the fifth book of which is quoted by Athenaeus, although he expresses a doubt about the genuineness of the work. Aethlius is also referred to by Clement of Alexandria and Eustathius, and in the Etymologicum Magnum. His dates are uncertain, but it is probable he lived some time in the 5th or 4th century BC.

== Recent editions ==
- Fowler R.L., Early Greek Mythography. 1 (Oxford, 2000), 29 s. and Early Greek Mythography. Volume 2. Commentary (Oxford, 2013), p. 619-620
- D'Hautcourt A., “Aethlios of Samos (536)”, in: Brill’s New Jacoby, Editor in Chief: Ian Worthington (University of Missouri). Consulted online on 31 August 2016 . https://dx.doi.org/10.1163/1873-5363_bnj_a536

== Sources ==
- Champion C. B., Aethlios of Samos (FGrH 536), The Encyclopedia of Ancient History 1 (2015) (DOI: 10.1002/9781444338386.wbeah26154)
