= Aegles =

Ancient Greek athlete

Aegles (Ancient Greek: Αίγλης) was a Samian athlete, who was mute. He recovered his voice when he made an effort on one occasion to express his indignation at an attempt to impose upon him in a public contest.
