= Samos (town) =

Samos Σάμος
- Community
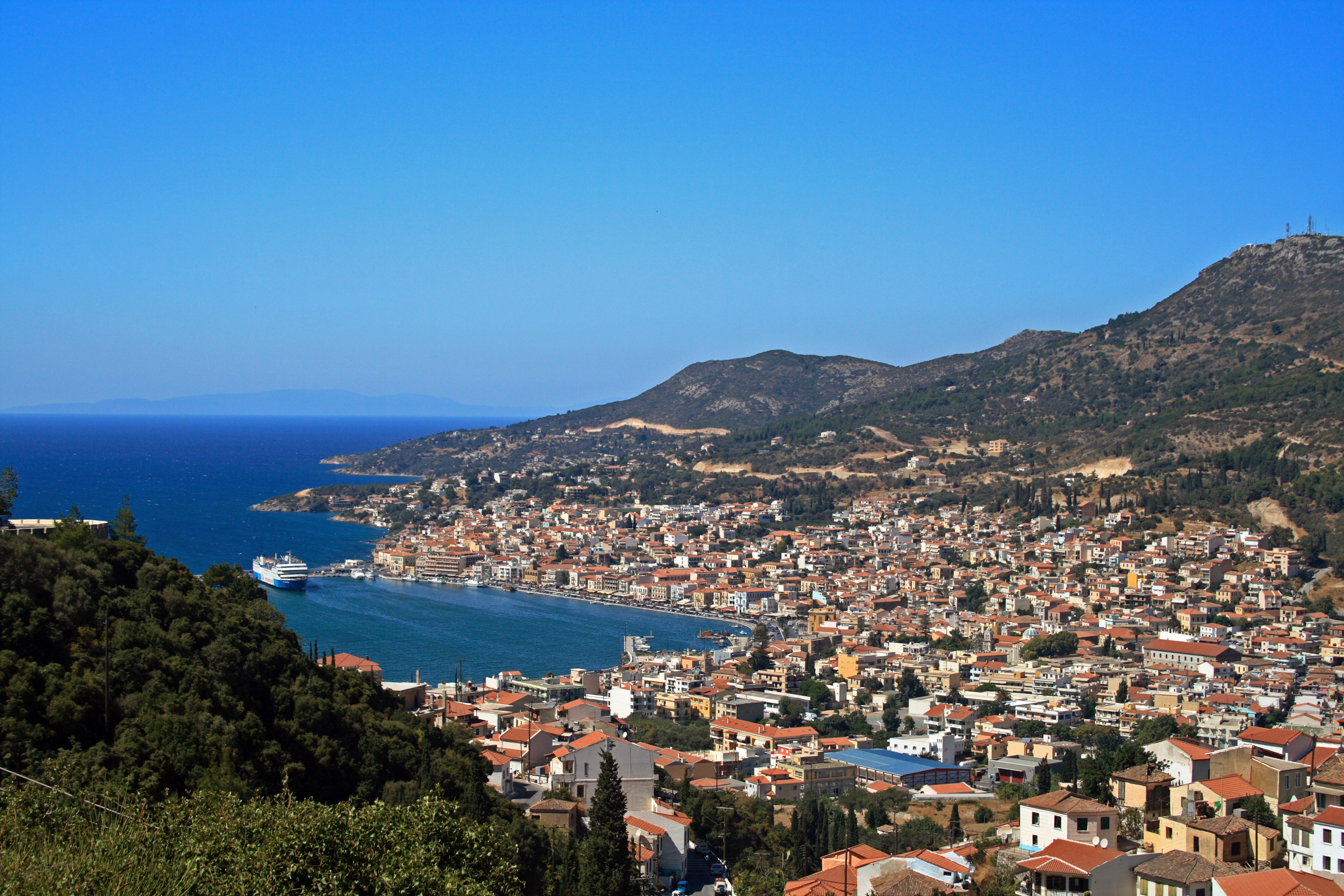
- Samos town from Ano Vathy

- Location within Greece
- Coordinates: 37°45′N 26°58′E
- Country: Greece
- Administrative region: North Aegean
- Regional unit: Samos
- Municipality: East Samos
- Municipal unit: Vathy

Area
  - Community: 9.37 km^{2} (3.62 sq mi)
- Elevation: 20 m (66 ft)

Population (2021)
  - Community: 5,951
  - Density: 635/km^{2} (1,640/sq mi)
- Demonym: Samian
- Time zone: UTC+2 (EET)
  - Summer (DST): UTC+3 (EEST)
- Postal code: 831 00
- Area code: 22730
- Vehicle registration: ΜΟ

Samos (Greek: Σάμος, before 1958: Λιμήν Βαθέος - Limin Vatheos) is a port town on the island of Samos in Greece. It is the capital of the regional unit of Samos and of the municipality of East Samos. It is also known by its old name of Vathy (Βαθύ), though this now usually refers to the old hillside suburb of Ano Vathy. According to the 2021 census, the population of Ano Vathy was 3,767, while the population of the port of Vathy was 5,950, giving a combined population of just over 9,700.

== History ==
The town of Samos was built in the middle of 18th century as the port of Vathy. At first, there were only depots for the necessities of the trade. Samos town was initially named Kato Vathy (meaning lower Vathy) or Limenas Vatheos (port of Vathy). The current name (Samos Town) was given in 1958 when it combined with Ano Vathy (upper Vathy) on the hillside above the port.

During the 19th century, Samos town became the administrative centre of the island. At that time, its population increased. After the union of Samos with Greece, Samos town remained the administrative centre of the island, as well as becoming the capital of the modern municipality of East Samos.

== Historical population ==
Year	Town
1991	5,792
2001	6,236
2011	6,251
2021	5,951

== Description ==
Samos town spreads from the coast at the port of Vathy up to the hillside neighbourhood of Ano Vathy. Its houses are built in an amphitheatrical formation around the bay. In front of the settlement is the port with a wharf more than 150 meters in length. Notable buildings in Samos are the old churches of Agios Nikolaos and Agios Spiridon, the town hall, the archaeological museum and two statues (the statue of Themistocles Sofoulis on the coastal road and the big lion statue on the central square).
