= Vathy, Samos =

Ano Vathy Άνω Βαθύ
- Municipal unit
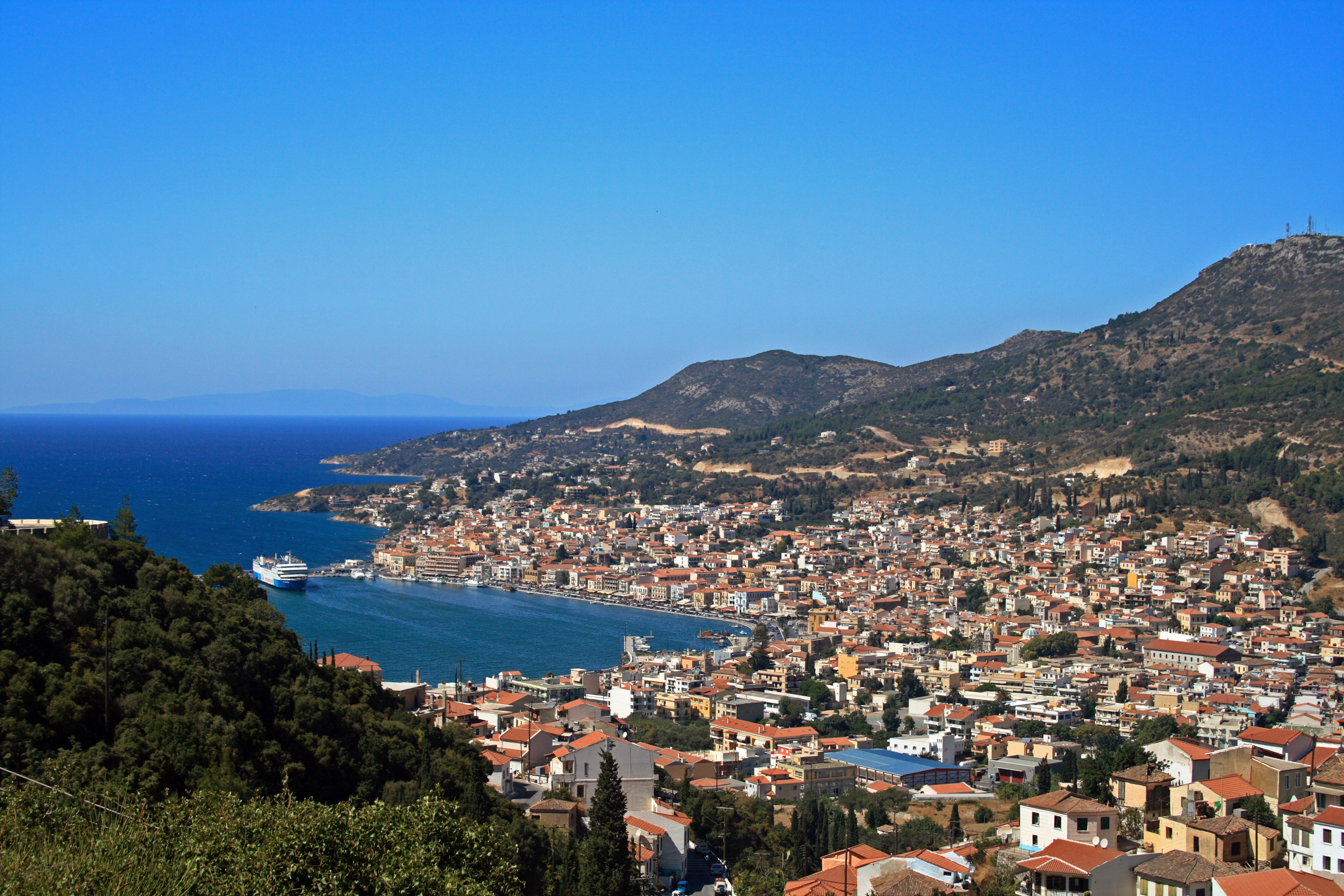
- View of Samos town from Ano Vathy

- Location within Greece
- Coordinates: 37°44′51″N 26°58′57″E
- Country: Greece
- Administrative region: North Aegean
- Regional unit: Samos
- Municipality: East Samos
- Elevation: 76 m (249 ft)

Population (2021)
  - Community: 3,767
- Time zone: UTC+2 (EET)
  - Summer (DST): UTC+3 (EEST)
- Postal code: 831 00
- Area code: 22730
- Vehicle registration: ΜΟ
- Website: www.vathi.gr

Vathy (Greek: Βαθύ, Vathý) is a community and a former municipality on the island of Samos, North Aegean, Greece. Since 2019, it has been a municipal unit of the municipality of East Samos. The town proper, also known as Ano Vathy (Άνω Βαθύ, upper Vathy), is an old hillside suburb of the town of Samos. Before 1958, the town of Samos was known as Limin Vatheos (port of Vathy); hence, many islanders still often refer to all of the town as Vathy. According to the 2021 census, the population of Ano Vathy was 3,767, while the population of the port of Vathy was 5,900, giving a combined population of just over 9,700.

== Notable people ==
- Themistoklis Sofoulis (1860–1949), politician, prime minister
- Stefan Bogoridi (1775–1859), first prince of Samos (1834–1850)
- William Roger Paton (1857-1921), author and scholar
