= East Samos =

East Samos Ανατολική Σάμος
- Municipality
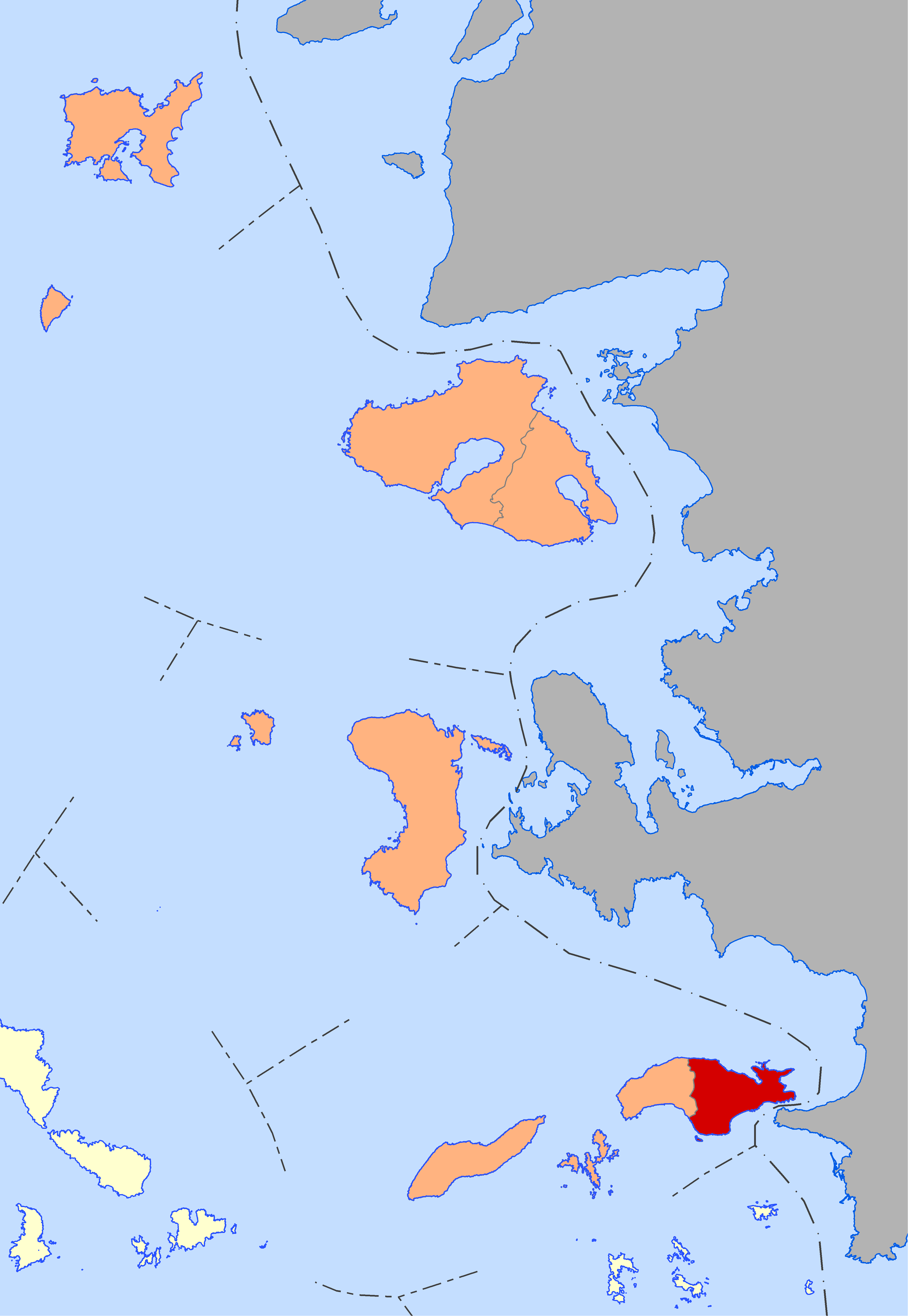

- Location within Greece
- Coordinates: 37°44′N 26°55′E
- Country: Greece
- Administrative region: North Aegean
- Regional unit: Samos
- Seat: Samos

Area
  - Municipality: 292.6 km^{2} (113.0 sq mi)

Population (2021)
  - Municipality: 20,021
  - Density: 68.42/km^{2} (177.2/sq mi)
- Time zone: UTC+2 (EET)
  - Summer (DST): UTC+3 (EEST)

East Samos (Greek: Ανατολική Σάμος Anatoliki Samos) is a municipality on the island of Samos in the North Aegean region in Greece. The municipality was formed at the 2019 local government reform, when the pre-existing municipality of Samos was divided in two. Its seat is the town Samos.

The municipality consists of the following two subdivisions (municipal units):

- Pythagoreio
- Vathy
