= Aegina =

Greek island, south of Athens

Aegina Αίγινα
- Municipality
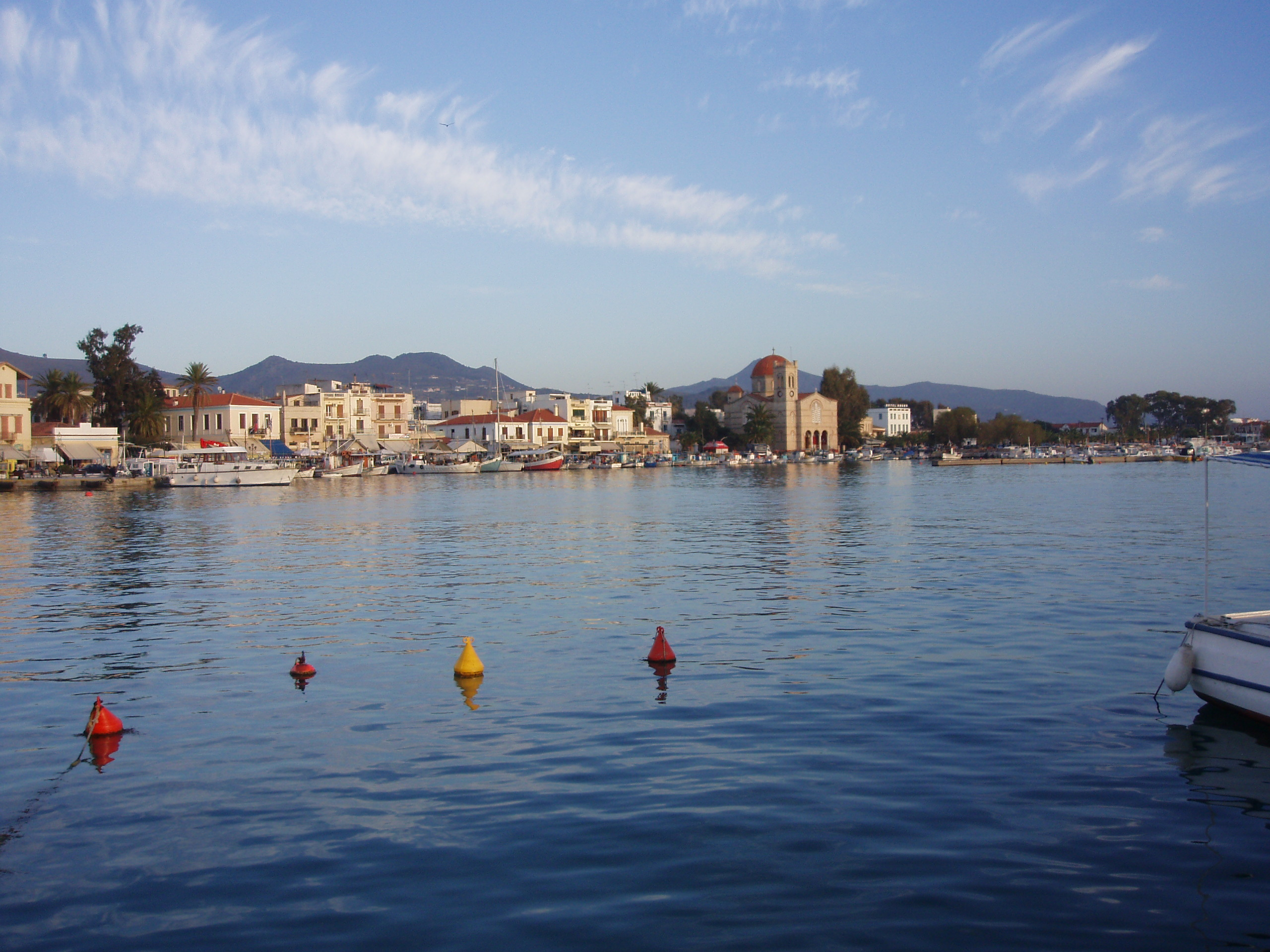
- View of Aegina's seafront

- Flag

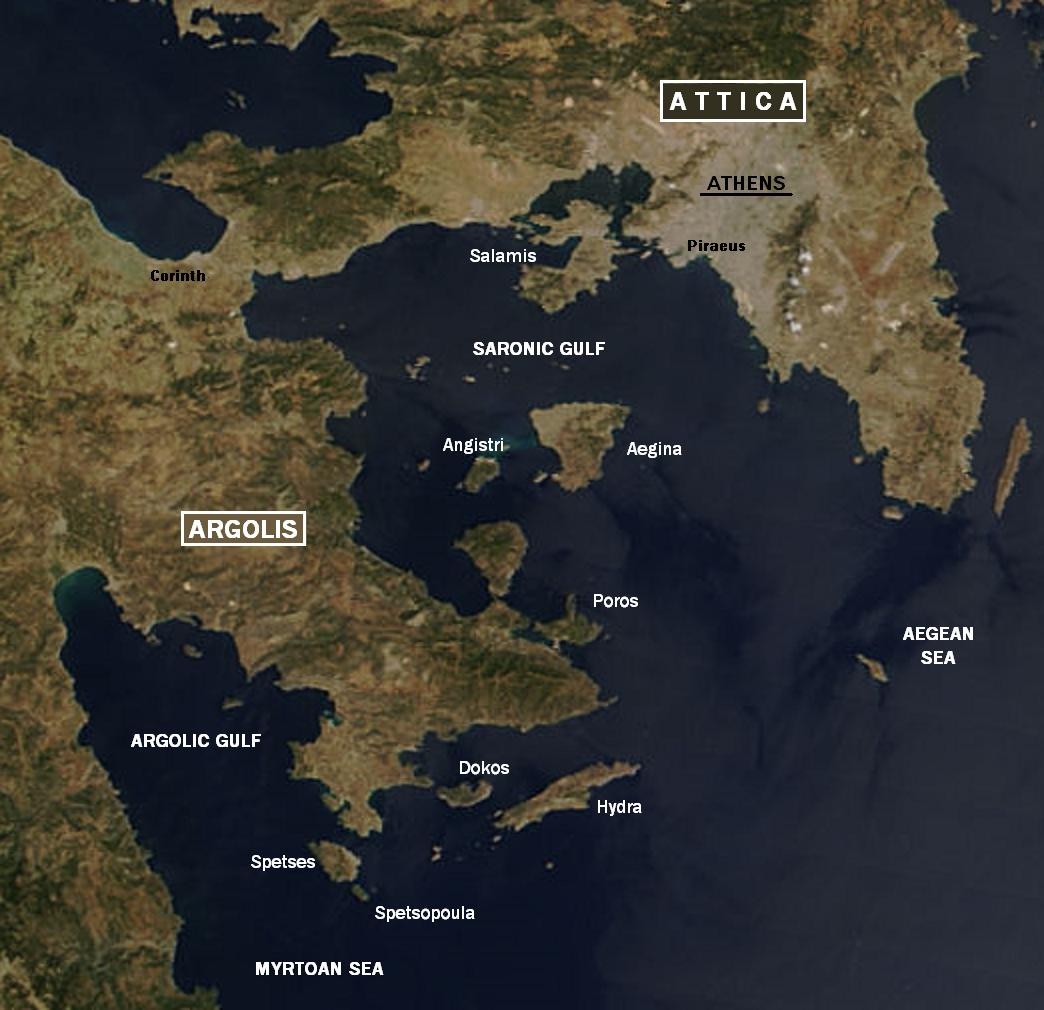
- Location in the Saronic Gulf

- Location within Greece
- Coordinates: 37°43′48″N 23°29′24″E
- Country: Greece
- Administrative region: Attica
- Regional unit: Islands

Government
  - Mayor: Ioannis Zormpas (since 2019)

Area
  - Municipality: 87.41 km^{2} (33.75 sq mi)

Population (2021)
  - Municipality: 12,911
  - Density: 147.7/km^{2} (382.6/sq mi)
  - Community: 6,976
- Time zone: UTC+2 (EET)
  - Summer (DST): UTC+3 (EEST)
- Postal code: 180 10
- Area code: 2297
- Vehicle registration: Υ
- Website: https://www.aegina.gr

Aegina (Greek: Αίγινα pronounced [ˈeʝina]; Ancient Greek: Αἴγῑνα) (Note: It is pronounced [ˈeʝina] in Demotic, Katharevousa, and [aí̯giːna] in Ancient Greek.) is one of the Saronic Islands of Greece in the Saronic Gulf, 27 km (17 mi) from Athens. Tradition derives the name from Aegina, the mother of the mythological hero Aeacus, who was born on the island and became its king. In classical antiquity Aegina was a powerful city-state and at one point a rival of Athens. In modern times Aegina is known for the temple of Aphaia, pistachio production, and the pilgrimage site of St. Nektarios. Many Athenians have established vacation homes in Aegina.

== Administration ==
=== Municipality ===
The municipality of Aegina consists of the island of Aegina and a few offshore islets. It is part of the Islands regional unit, Attica region. The municipality is subdivided into the following five communities (population in 2021 in parentheses):

- Aegina (6,976)
- Kypseli (2,166)
- Mesagros (1,473)
- Perdika (847)
- Vathy (1,449)

The regional capital is the town of Aegina, situated at the northwestern end of the island. Due to its proximity to Athens, it is a popular vacation place during the summer months, with quite a few Athenians owning second houses on the island. The buildings of the island are examples of Neoclassical architecture with a strong folk element, built in the 19th century.

=== Province ===
The province of Aegina (Greek: Επαρχία Αίγινας) was one of the provinces of the Attica Prefecture and was created in 1833 as part of Attica and Boeotia Prefecture. Its territory corresponded with that of the current municipalities Aegina and Agkistri until its abolishment in 2006.

== Geography ==
Aegina is roughly triangular in shape, approximately 15 km (9.3 mi) from east to west and 10 km (6.2 mi) from north to south, with an area of 87.41 km^{2} (33.75 sq mi).

An extinct volcano constitutes two-thirds of Aegina. The northern and western sides consist of stony but fertile plains, which are well cultivated and produce luxuriant crops of grain, with some cotton, vines, almonds, olives and figs, but the most characteristic crop of Aegina today (2000s) is pistachio. Economically, the sponge fisheries are of importance. The southern volcanic part of the island is rugged and mountainous, and largely barren. Its highest rise is the conical Mount Oros (531 m) in the south, and the Panhellenian ridge stretches northward with narrow fertile valleys on either side.

The beaches are also a popular tourist attraction. Hydrofoil ferries from Piraeus take only forty minutes to reach Aegina; the regular ferry takes about an hour. There are regular bus services from Aegina town to destinations throughout the island such as Agia Marina. Portes is a fishing village on the east coast.

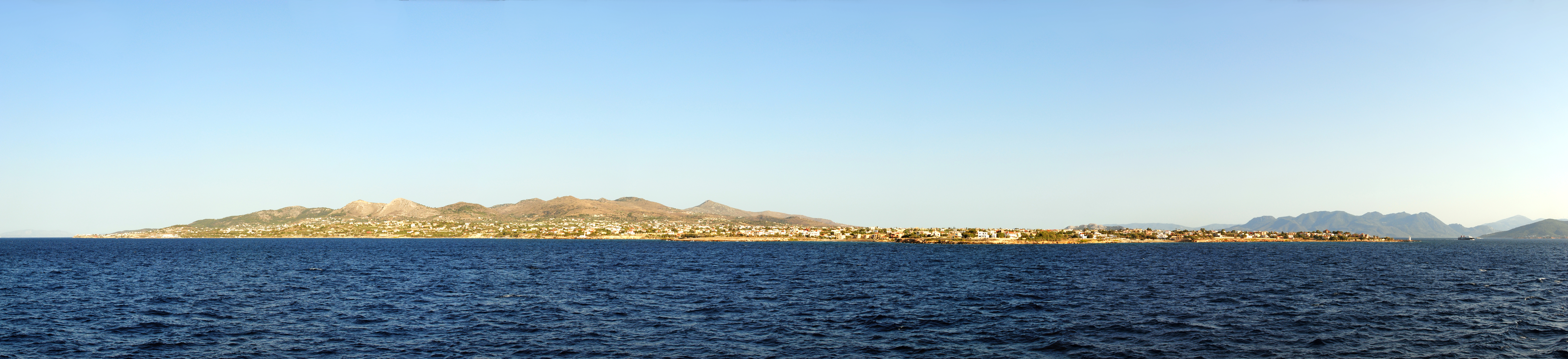
A panorama of the island of Aegina, from the Mediterranean sea.

== Climate ==
Aegina island has a hot semi-arid climate (Köppen climate classification: BSh) with an average annual temperature of around 20.0 °C and an average annual precipitation of less than 340 mm.

Climate data for Aegina
Month	Jan	Feb	Mar	Apr	May	Jun	Jul	Aug	Sep	Oct	Nov	Dec	Year
Record high °C (°F)	25.6 (78.1)	24.2 (75.6)	24.6 (76.3)	29.6 (85.3)	34.8 (94.6)	40.2 (104.4)	42.5 (108.5)	43.4 (110.1)	37.1 (98.8)	31.6 (88.9)	29.9 (85.8)	23.4 (74.1)	43.4 (110.1)
Mean daily maximum °C (°F)	14.1 (57.4)	15.4 (59.7)	17.2 (63.0)	21.4 (70.5)	25.9 (78.6)	30.8 (87.4)	33.8 (92.8)	33.5 (92.3)	29.1 (84.4)	24.0 (75.2)	19.9 (67.8)	15.6 (60.1)	23.4 (74.1)
Daily mean °C (°F)	11.5 (52.7)	12.6 (54.7)	13.9 (57.0)	17.3 (63.1)	21.5 (70.7)	26.0 (78.8)	29.1 (84.4)	29.3 (84.7)	25.5 (77.9)	21.0 (69.8)	17.2 (63.0)	13.3 (55.9)	19.9 (67.7)
Mean daily minimum °C (°F)	9.0 (48.2)	9.8 (49.6)	10.6 (51.1)	13.2 (55.8)	17.1 (62.8)	21.2 (70.2)	24.5 (76.1)	25.0 (77.0)	21.8 (71.2)	18.0 (64.4)	14.6 (58.3)	10.9 (51.6)	16.3 (61.4)
Record low °C (°F)	−0.4 (31.3)	1.2 (34.2)	1.2 (34.2)	5.8 (42.4)	12.4 (54.3)	14.7 (58.5)	18.6 (65.5)	20.8 (69.4)	14.8 (58.6)	12.2 (54.0)	6.8 (44.2)	2.7 (36.9)	−0.4 (31.3)
Average rainfall mm (inches)	50.8 (2.00)	25.9 (1.02)	25.2 (0.99)	18.0 (0.71)	8.0 (0.31)	17.6 (0.69)	4.7 (0.19)	6.8 (0.27)	45.8 (1.80)	27.1 (1.07)	55.9 (2.20)	50.7 (2.00)	336.5 (13.25)
Source: National Observatory of Athens Monthly Bulletins (Dec 2013 – Feb 2024) and World Meteorological Organization

== History ==
Aegina, according to Herodotus, was a colony of Epidaurus, to which state it was originally subject. Its placement between Attica and the Peloponnesus made it a site of trade even earlier, and its earliest inhabitants allegedly came from Asia Minor.

=== Early Bronze ===
The most important Early Bronze Age settlement was Kolonna, stone-built fortified site. The main connections were with the Greek mainland, but there were found also influences from Cyclades and Crete.

Another important deposit of Early Bronze Age golden and silver jewellery was discovered by Austrian archaeologists.

=== Middle Bronze ===
Minoan ceramics have been found in contexts of c. 2000 BC. The famous Aegina Treasure, now in the British Museum is estimated to date between 1700 and 1500 BC.

Archaeological excavations at Cape Kolonna revealed a purple dye workshop dating back to the 16th century BC.

=== Late Bronze ===
The discovery on the island of a number of gold ornaments belonging to the last period of Mycenaean art suggests that Mycenaean culture existed in Aegina for some generations after the Dorian conquest of Argos and Lacedaemon.

At Mount Ellanio, a Mycenaean refuge has been found dating to the end of the Late Bronze Age.

=== Iron Age ===
It is probable that the island was not Doricised before the 9th century BC.

One of the earliest historical facts is its membership in the Amphictyony or League of Calauria, attested around the 8th century BC. This ostensibly religious league included, besides Aegina, Athens, the Minyan (Boeotian) Orchomenos, Troezen, Hermione, Nauplia, and Prasiae. It was probably an organisation of city-states that were still Mycenaean, for the purpose of suppressing piracy in the Aegean that began as a result of the decay of the naval supremacy of the Mycenaean princes.

Aegina seems to have belonged to the Eretrian league during the Lelantine War; this, perhaps, may explain the war with Samos, a major member of the rival Chalcidian League during the reign of King Amphicrates (Herod. iii. 59), i.e. not later than the earlier half of the 7th century BC.

==== Coinage and sea power (7th–5th centuries BC) ====
Coins of Aegina

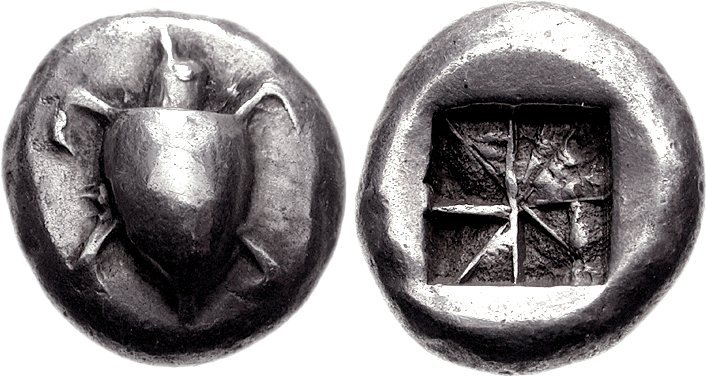
Silver stater of Aegina, 550–530 BC. Obv. Sea turtle with large pellets down centre. Rev. incuse square punch with eight sections.

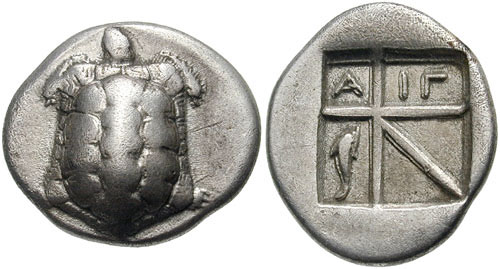
Silver drachma of Aegina, 404–340 BC. Obverse: Land tortoise. Reverse: inscription ΑΙΓ(INA) "Aegina" and dolphin.

Its early history reveals that the maritime importance of the island dates back to pre-Dorian times. It is usually stated on the authority of Ephorus, that Pheidon of Argos established a mint in Aegina, the first city-state to issue coins in Europe, the Aeginetic stater. One stamped stater (having the mark of some authority in the form of a picture or words) can be seen in the Bibliothèque Nationale of Paris. It is an electrum stater of a turtle, an animal sacred to Aphrodite, struck at Aegina that dates from 700 BC. Therefore, it is thought that the Aeginetes, within 30 or 40 years of the invention of coinage in Asia Minor by the Ionian Greeks or the Lydians (c. 630 BC), might have been the ones to introduce coinage to the Western world. The fact that the Aeginetic standard of weights and measures (developed during the mid-7th century) was one of the two standards in general use in the Greek world (the other being the Euboic-Attic) is sufficient evidence of the early commercial importance of the island. The Aeginetic weight standard of about 12.2 grams was widely adopted in the Greek world during the 7th century BC. The Aeginetic stater was divided into two drachmae of 6.1 grams of silver. Staters depicting a sea-turtle were struck up to the end of the 5th century BC. During the First Peloponnesian War, by 456 BC, it was replaced by the land tortoise.

During the naval expansion of Aegina during the Archaic Period, Kydonia was an ideal maritime stop for Aegina's fleet on its way to other Mediterranean ports controlled by the emerging sea-power Aegina. During the next century Aegina was one of the three principal states trading at the emporium of Naucratis in Egypt, and it was the only Greek state near Europe that had a share in this factory. At the beginning of the 5th century BC it seems to have been an entrepôt of the Pontic grain trade, which, at a later date, became an Athenian monopoly.

Unlike the other commercial states of the 7th and 6th centuries BC, such as Corinth, Chalcis, Eretria and Miletus, Aegina did not found any colonies. The settlements to which Strabo refers (viii. 376) cannot be regarded as any real exceptions to this statement.

==== Rivalry with Athens (5th century BC) ====
The known history of Aegina is almost exclusively a history of its relations with the neighbouring state of Athens, which began to compete with the thalassocracy (sea power) of Aegina about the beginning of the 6th century BC. Solon passed laws limiting Aeginetan commerce in Attica. The legendary history of these relations, as recorded by Herodotus (v. 79–89; vi. 49–51, 73, 85–94), involves critical problems of some difficulty and interest. He traces the hostility of the two states back to a dispute about the images of the goddesses Damia and Auxesia, which the Aeginetes had carried off from Epidauros, their parent state.

The Epidaurians had been accustomed to make annual offerings to the Athenian deities Athena and Erechtheus in payment for the Athenian olive-wood of which the statues were made. Upon the refusal of the Aeginetes to continue these offerings, the Athenians endeavoured to carry away the images. Their design was frustrated miraculously (according to the Aeginetan version, the statues fell upon their knees) and only a single survivor returned to Athens. There he became victim to the fury of his comrades' widows who pierced him with their peplos brooch-pins. No date is assigned by Herodotus for this "old feud"; writers such as J. B. Bury and R. W. Macan suggest the period between Solon and Peisistratus, c. 570 BC. It is possible that the whole episode is mythical. A critical analysis of the narrative seems to reveal little else than a series of aetiological traditions (explanatory of cults and customs), such as of the kneeling posture of the images of Damia and Auxesia, of the use of native ware instead of Athenian in their worship, and of the change in women's dress at Athens from the Dorian peplos to the Ionian style chiton.

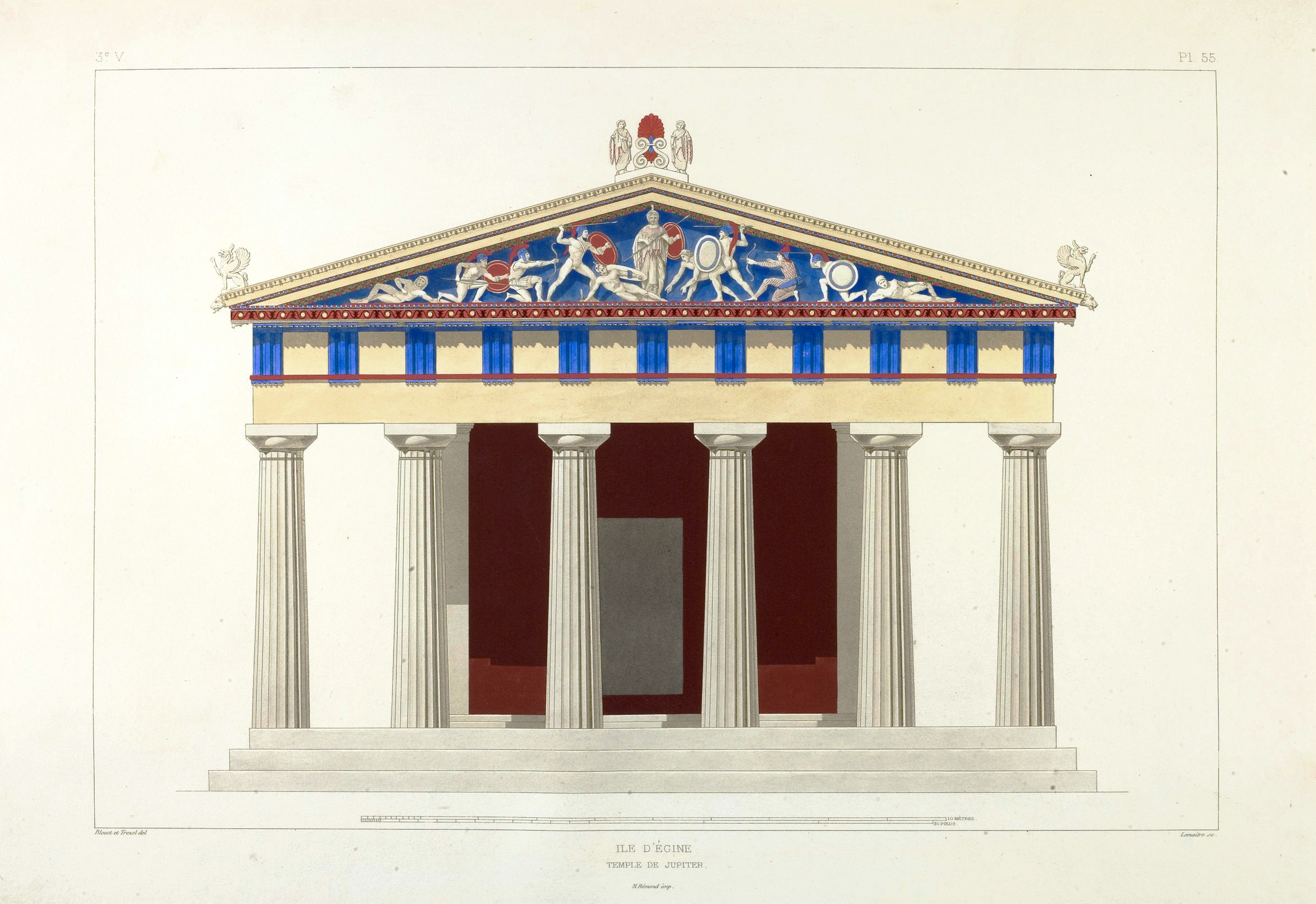
Colour depiction of the Temple of Aphaea, sacred to a mother goddess, particularly worshiped on Aegina.

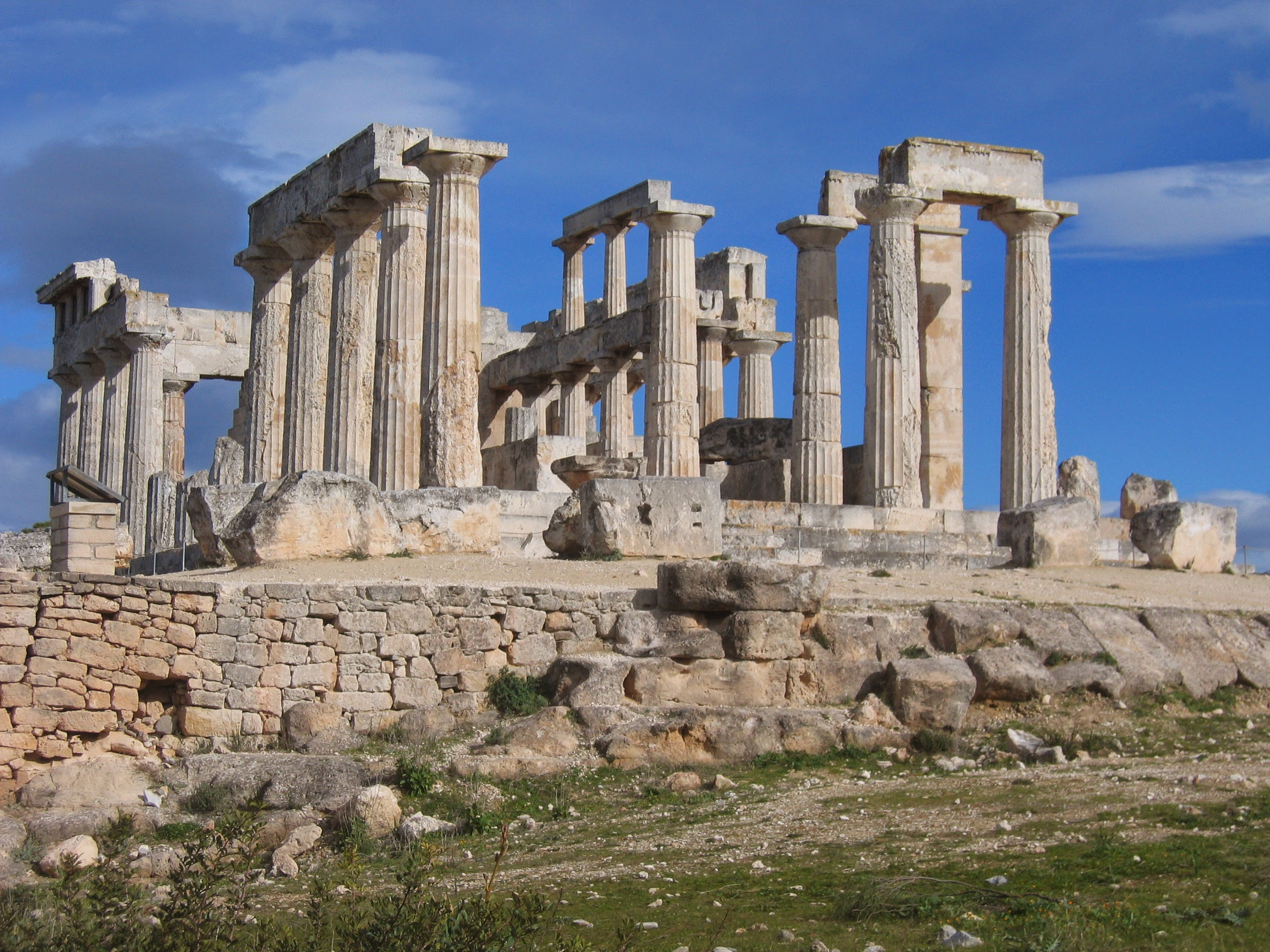
The Temple of Aphaea (about 490 BC)

In the early years of the 5th century BC the Thebans, after the defeat by Athens about 507 BC, appealed to Aegina for assistance. The Aeginetans at first contented themselves with sending the images of the Aeacidae, the tutelary heroes of their island. Subsequently, however, they contracted an alliance, and ravaged the seaboard of Attica. The Athenians were preparing to make reprisals, in spite of the advice of the Delphic oracle that they should desist from attacking Aegina for thirty years, and content themselves meanwhile with dedicating a precinct to Aeacus, when their projects were interrupted by the Spartan intrigues for the restoration of Hippias.

In 491 BC Aegina was one of the states which gave the symbols of submission ("earth and water") to Achaemenid Persia. Athens at once appealed to Sparta to punish this act of medism, and Cleomenes I, one of the Spartan kings, crossed over to the island, to arrest those who were responsible for it. His attempt was at first unsuccessful; but, after the deposition of Demaratus, he visited the island a second time, accompanied by his new colleague Leotychides, seized ten of the leading citizens and deposited them at Athens as hostages.

After the death of Cleomenes and the refusal of the Athenians to restore the hostages to Leotychides, the Aeginetes retaliated by seizing a number of Athenians at a festival at Sounion. Thereupon the Athenians concerted a plot with Nicodromus, the leader of the democratic party in the island, for the betrayal of Aegina. He was to seize the old city, and they were to come to his aid on the same day with seventy vessels. The plot failed owing to the late arrival of the Athenian force, when Nicodromus had already fled the island. An engagement followed in which the Aeginetes were defeated. Subsequently, however, they succeeded in winning a victory over the Athenian fleet.

All the incidents subsequent to the appeal of Athens to Sparta are referred expressly by Herodotus to the interval between the sending of the heralds in 491 BC and the invasion of Datis and Artaphernes in 490 BC (cf. Herod. vi. 49 with 94).

There are difficulties with this story, of which the following are the principal elements:

- Herodotus nowhere states or implies that peace was concluded between the two states before 481 BC, nor does he distinguish between different wars during this period. Hence it would follow that the war lasted from soon after 507 BC until the congress at the Isthmus of Corinth in 481 BC
- It is only for two years (491 and 490 BC) out of the twenty-five that any details are given. It is the more remarkable that no incidents are recorded in the period between the battles of Marathon and Salamis, since at the time of the Isthmian Congress the war was described as the most important one then being waged in Greece,
- It is improbable that Athens would have sent twenty vessels to the aid of the Ionians in 499 BC if at the time it was at war with Aegina.
- There is an incidental indication of time, which indicates the period after Marathon as the true date for the events which are referred by Herodotus to the year before Marathon, viz. the thirty years that were to elapse between the dedication of the precinct to Aeacus and the final victory of Athens. As the final victory of Athens over Aegina was in 458 BC, the thirty years of the oracle would carry us back to the year 488 BC as the date of the dedication of the precinct and the beginning of hostilities. This inference is supported by the date of the building of the 200 triremes "for the war against Aegina" on the advice of Themistocles, which is given in the Constitution of Athens as 483–482 BC.

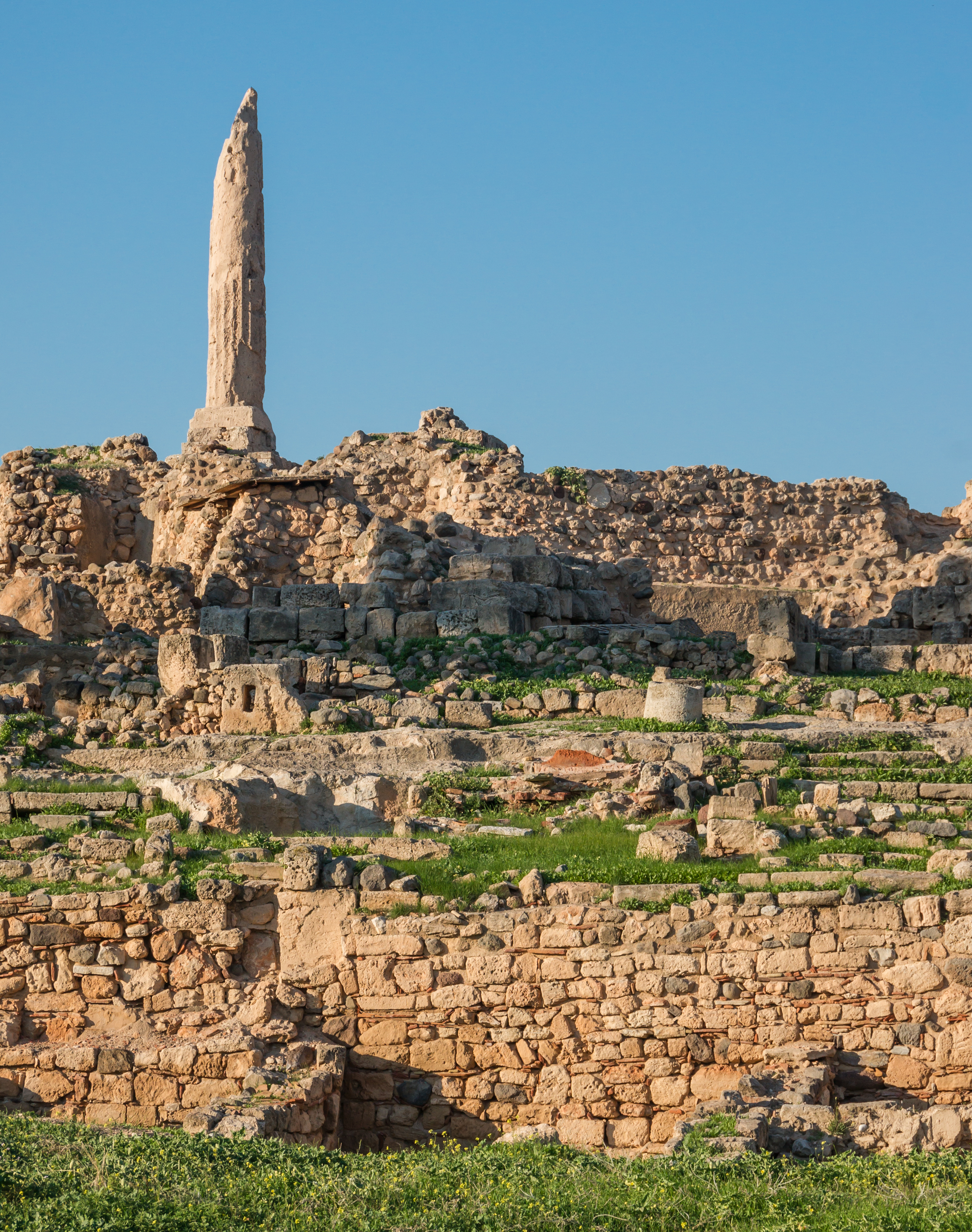
The ruins of the Temple of Apollo.

It is probable, therefore, that Herodotus is in error both in tracing back the beginning of hostilities to an alliance between Thebes and Aegina (c. 507 BC) and in claiming the episode of Nicodromus occurred prior to the battle of Marathon.

The real occasion of the beginning of the war was the refusal of Athens to restore the hostages some twenty years later. There was but one war, and it lasted from 488 to 481 BC. That Athens had the worst of it in this war is certain. Herodotus had no Athenian victories to record after the initial success, and the fact that Themistocles was able to carry his proposal to devote the surplus funds of the state to the building of so large a fleet seems to imply that the Athenians were themselves convinced that a supreme effort was necessary.

In confirmation of this opinion, that the naval supremacy of Aegina is assigned by the ancient writers on chronology to precisely this period, i.e. the years 490–480 BC.

=== Decline ===
In the repulse of Xerxes I it is possible that the Aeginetes played a larger part than is conceded to them by Herodotus. The Athenian tradition, which he follows in the main, would naturally seek to obscure their services. It was to Aegina rather than Athens that the prize of valour at Salamis was awarded, and the destruction of the Persian fleet appears to have been as much the work of the Aeginetan contingent as of the Athenian (Herod. viii. 91). There are other indications, too, of the importance of the Aeginetan fleet in the Greek scheme of defence. In view of these considerations it becomes difficult to credit the number of the vessels that is assigned to them by Herodotus (30 as against 180 Athenian vessels, cf. Greek History, sect. Authorities). During the next twenty years the Philo-Laconian policy of Cimon secured Aegina, as a member of the Spartan league, from attack. The change in Athenian foreign policy, which was consequent upon the ostracism of Cimon in 461 BC, resulted in what is sometimes called the First Peloponnesian War, during which most of the fighting was experienced by Corinth and Aegina. The latter state was forced to surrender to Athens after a siege, and to accept the position of a subject-ally (c. 456 BC). The tribute was fixed at 30 talents.

By the terms of the Thirty Years' Peace (445 BC) Athens promised to restore to Aegina her autonomy, but the clause remained ineffective. During the first winter of the Peloponnesian War (431 BC) Athens expelled the Aeginetans and established a cleruchy in their island. The exiles were settled by Sparta in Thyreatis, on the frontiers of Laconia and Argolis. Even in their new home they were not safe from Athenian rancour. A force commanded by Nicias landed in 424 BC, and killed most of them. At the end of the Peloponnesian War Lysander restored the scattered remnants of the old inhabitants to the island, which was used by the Spartans as a base for operations against Athens during the Corinthian War.

It is probable that the power of Aegina had steadily declined during the twenty years after Salamis, and that it had declined absolutely, as well as relatively to that of Athens. Commerce was the source of Aegina's greatness, and her trade, which seems to have been principally with the Levant, must have suffered seriously from the war with Persia. Aegina's medism in 491 is to be explained by its commercial relations with the Persian Empire. It was forced into patriotism in spite of itself, and the glory won by the Battle of Salamis was paid for by the loss of its trade and the decay of its marine. The loss of the state's power is explained by the conditions of the island, which was based on slave labour.

=== Hellenistic period and Roman rule ===
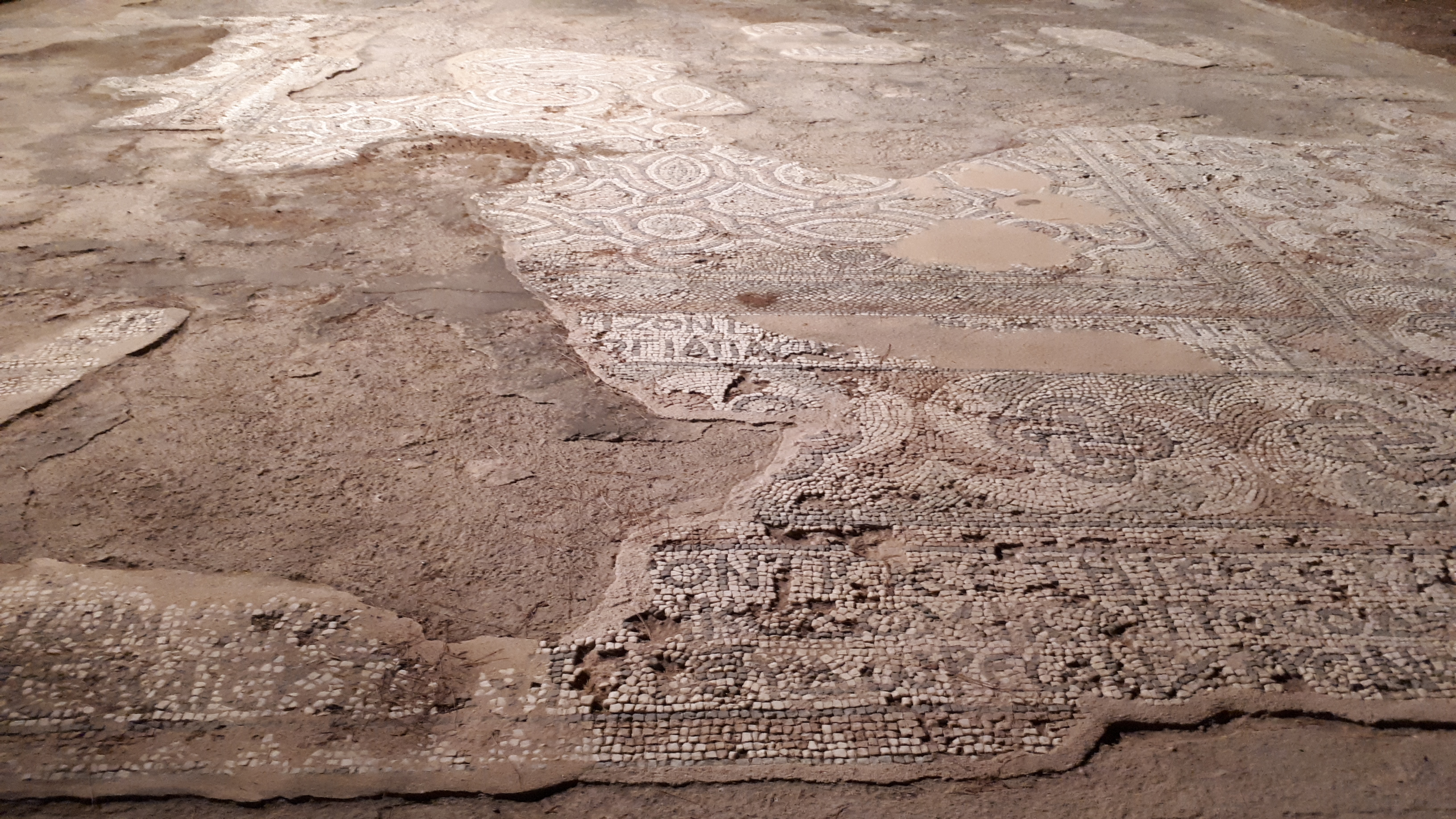
The remains of the 4th century synagogue at the Archaeological Museum of Aegina

Aegina with the rest of Greece became dominated successively by the Macedonians (322–229 BC), the Achaeans (229–211 BC), Aetolians (211–210 BC), Attalus of Pergamum (210–133 BC) and the Romans (after 133 BC). A sign at the Archaeological Museum of Aegina is reported to say that a Jewish community was established in Aegina "at the end of the second and during the 3rd century AD" by Jews fleeing the barbarian invasions of the time in Greece. However, the first phases of those invasions began in the 4th century. The Romaniote Jewish community erected an elaborate synagogue in rectangle form with an apse on the eastern wall with a magnificent mosaic decorated with geometric motifs, still preserved in the courtyard of the Archaeological Museum of Aegina. The synagogue dates from the 4th century AD and was in use until the 7th century AD. Local Christian tradition has it that a Christian community was established there in the 1st century. There are written records of participation by later bishops of Aegina, Gabriel and Thomas, in the Councils of Constantinople in 869 and 879. The see was at first a suffragan of the metropolitan see of Corinth, but was later given the rank of archdiocese. No longer a residential bishopric, Aegina is today listed by the Catholic Church as a titular see.

=== Byzantine period ===
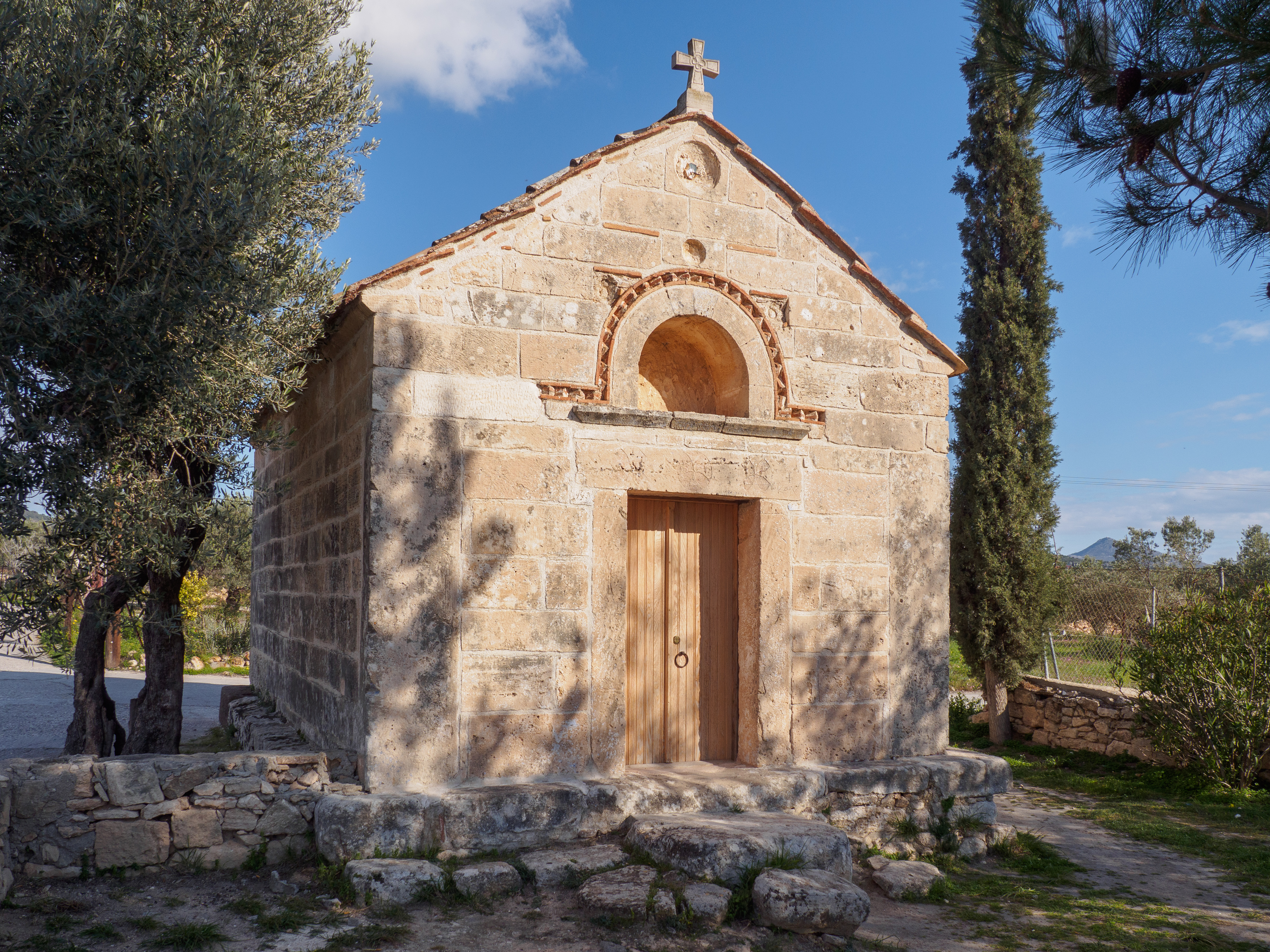
The Byzantine church of Agioi Theodoroi

Aegina belonged to the East Roman (Byzantine) Empire after the division of the Roman Empire in 395. It remained Eastern Roman during the period of crisis of the 7th–8th centuries, when most of the Balkans and parts of the Greek mainland were overrun by Slavic invasions. Indeed, according to the Chronicle of Monemvasia, the island served as a refuge for the Corinthians fleeing these incursions. The island flourished during the early 9th century, as evidenced by church construction activity, but suffered greatly from Arab raids originating from Crete. Various hagiographies, such as those of Athanasia of Aegina or Theodora of Thessalonica, record a large-scale raid c. 830, that resulted in the flight of much of the population to the Greek mainland. During that time, some of the population sought refuge in the island's hinterland, establishing the settlement of Paliachora.

According to the 12th-century bishop of Athens, Michael Choniates, by his time the island had become a base for pirates. This is corroborated by Benedict of Peterborough's graphic account of Greece, as it was in 1191; he states that many of the islands were uninhabited for fear of pirates and that Aegina, along with Salamis and Makronisos, were their strongholds.

=== Frankish rule after 1204 ===
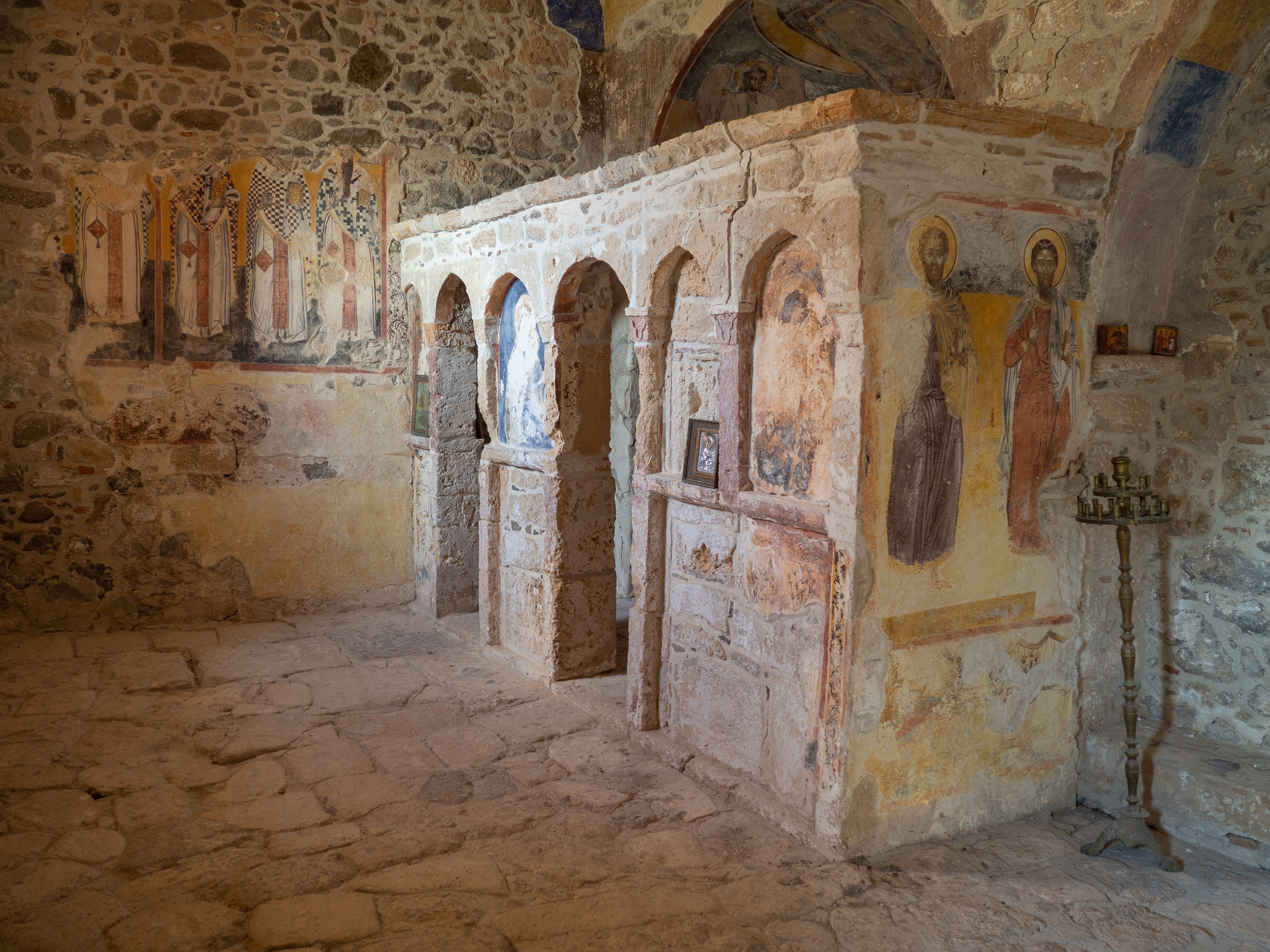
The former catholic church known as Saint George of the Forum in Paliachora, the medieval capital of Aegina.

After the dissolution and partition of the Byzantine Empire by the Fourth Crusade in 1204, Aegina was accorded to the Republic of Venice. In the event, it became controlled by the Duchy of Athens. The Catalan Company seized control of Athens, and with it Aegina, in 1317, and in 1425 the island became controlled by the Venetians, when Alioto Caopena, at that time ruler of Aegina, placed himself by treaty under the Republic's protection to escape the danger of a Turkish raid. The island must then have been fruitful, for one of the conditions by which Venice accorded him protection was that he should supply grain to Venetian colonies. He agreed to surrender the island to Venice if his family became extinct. Antonio II Acciaioli opposed the treaty for one of his adopted daughters had married the future lord of Aegina, Antonello Caopena.

=== Venetians in Aegina (1451–1537) ===
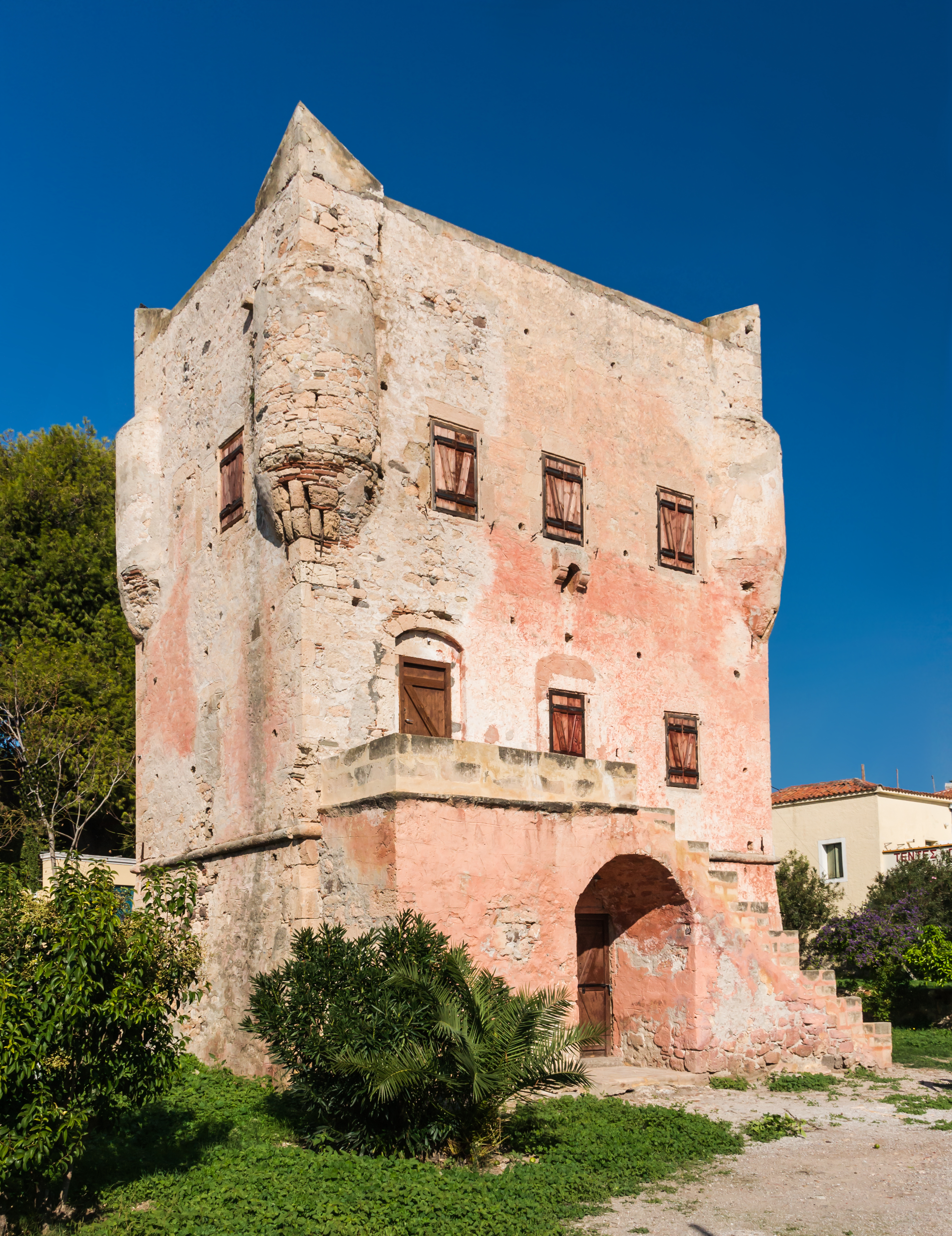
The Venetian era Markellos tower

In 1451, Aegina became Venetian. The islanders welcomed Venetian rule; the claims of Antonello's uncle Arnà, who had lands in Argolis, were satisfied by a pension. A Venetian governor (rettore) was appointed, who was dependent on the authorities of Nauplia. After Arnà's death, his son Alioto renewed his claim to the island but was told that the republic was resolved to keep it. He and his family were pensioned and one of them aided in the defence of Aegina against the Turks in 1537, was captured with his family, and died in a Turkish dungeon.

In 1463 the Turco-Venetian war began, which was destined to cost the Venetians Negroponte (Euboea), the island of Lemnos, most of the Cyclades islands, Scudra and their colonies in the Morea. Peace was concluded in 1479. Venice still retained Aegina, Lepanto (Naupactus), Nauplia, Monemvasia, Modon, Navarino, Coron, and the islands Crete, Mykonos and Tinos. Aegina remained subject to Nauplia.

==== Administration ====
Aegina obtained money for its defenses by reluctantly sacrificing its cherished relic, the head of St. George, which had been carried there from Livadia by the Catalans. In 1462, the Venetian Senate ordered the relic to be removed to St. Giorgio Maggiore in Venice and on 12 November, it was transported from Aegina by Vettore Cappello, the famous Venetian commander. In return, the Senate gave the Aeginetes 100 ducats apiece towards fortifying the island.

In 1519, the government was reformed. The system of having two rectors was found to result in frequent quarrels and the republic thenceforth sent out a single official styled Bailie and Captain, assisted by two councillors, who performed the duties of camerlengo by turns. The Bailie's authority extended over the rector of Aegina, whereas Kastri (opposite the island Hydra) was granted to two families, the Palaiologoi and the Alberti.

Society at Nauplia was divided into three classes: nobles, citizens and plebeians, and it was customary for nobles alone to possess the much-coveted local offices, such as the judge of the inferior court and inspector of weights and measures. The populace now demanded its share and the home government ordered that at least one of the three inspectors should be a non-noble.

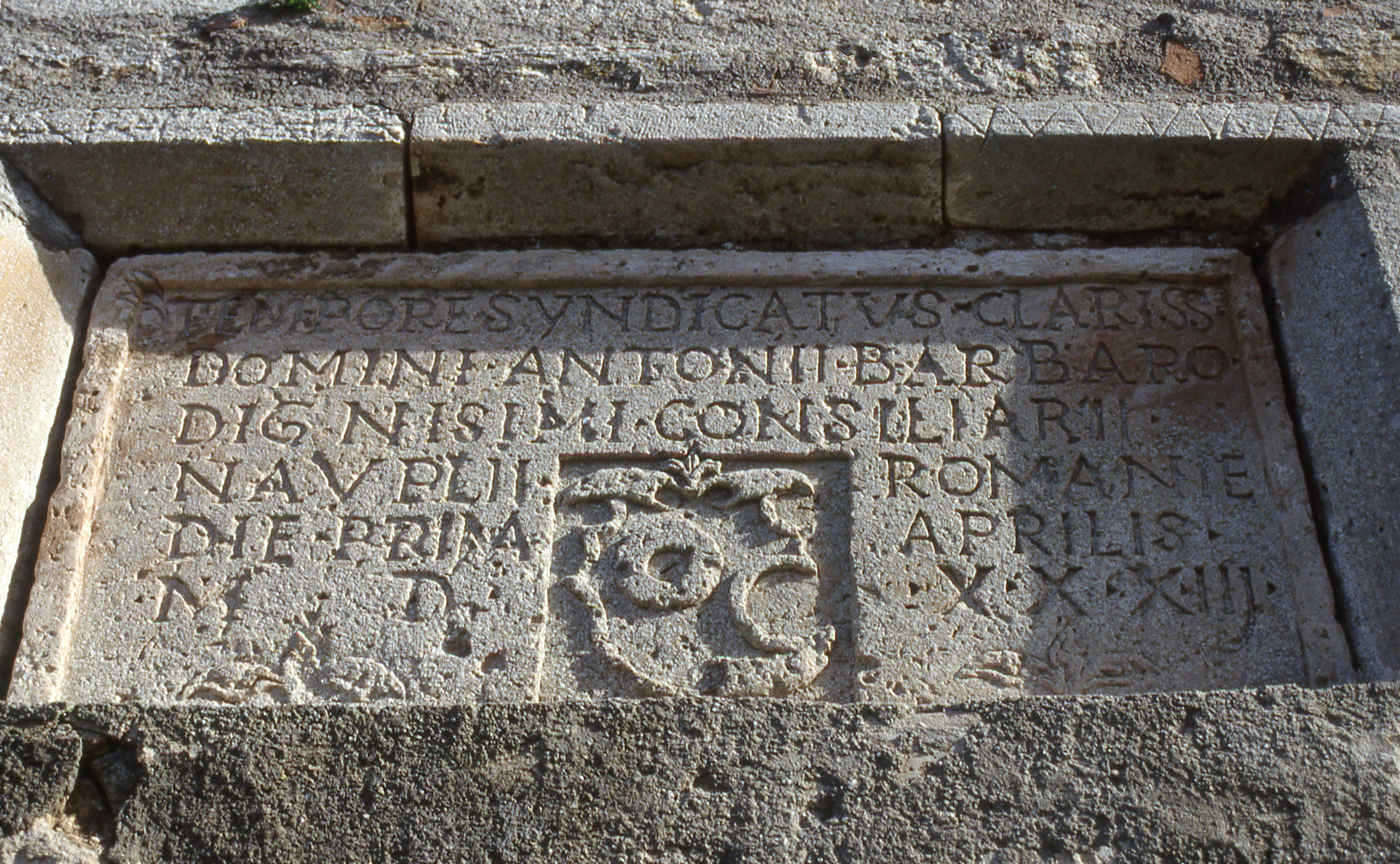
Latin inscription over the entrance of St. George the Catholic in Paliachora, recording the visit of Antonio Barbaro, the Venetian captain of Nauplia, on 1 April 1533.

Aegina had always been exposed to the raids of corsairs and had oppressive governors during these last 30 years of Venetian rule. Venetian nobles were not willing to go to this island. In 1533, three rectors of Aegina were punished for their acts of injustice and there is a graphic account of the reception given by the Aeginetans to the captain of Nauplia, who came to command an enquiry into the administration of these delinquents (vid. inscription over the entrance of St. George the Catholic in Paliachora). The rectors had spurned their ancient right to elect an islander to keep one key of the money-chest. They had also threatened to leave the island en masse with the commissioner, unless the captain avenged their wrongs. To spare the economy of the community, it was ordered that appeals from the governor's decision should be made on Crete, instead of in Venice. The republic was to pay a bakshish to the Turkish governor of the Morea and to the voivode who was stationed at the frontier of Thermisi (opposite Hydra). The fortifications too, were allowed to become decrepit and were inadequately guarded.

==== 16th century ====
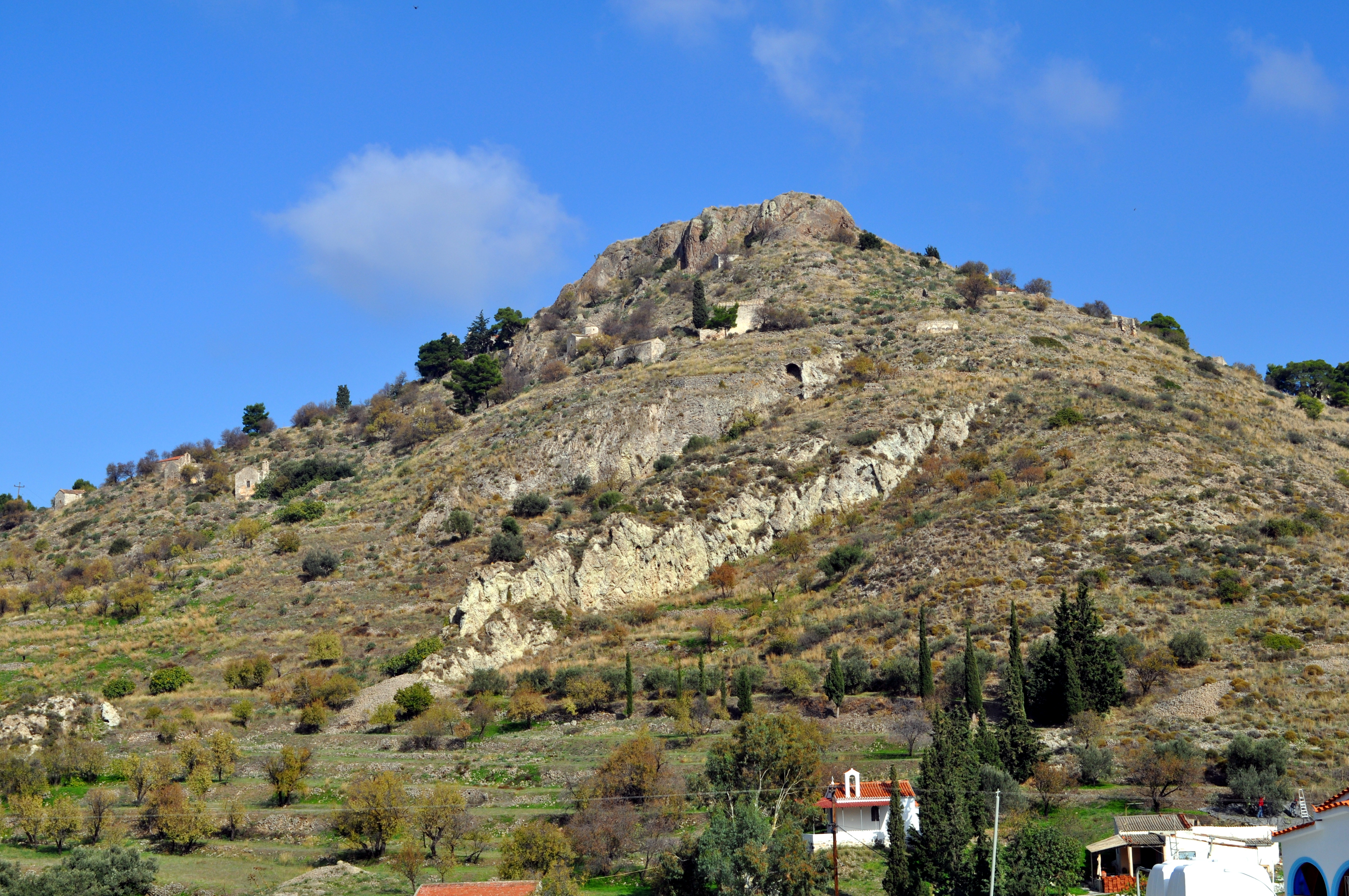
The ruins of Paliachora. Walls, houses, and castle have been destroyed, only the chapels were restored.

After the end of the Duchy of Athens and the principality of Achaia, the only Latin possessions left on the mainland of Greece were the papal city of Monemvasia, the fortress of Vonitsa, the Messenian stations Coron and Modon, Lepanto, Pteleon, Navarino, and the castles of Argos and Nauplia, to which the island of Aegina was subordinate.

In 1502–03, the new peace treaty left Venice with nothing but Cephalonia, Monemvasia and Nauplia, with their appurtenances in the Morea. And against the sack of Megara, it had to endure the temporary capture of the castle of Aegina by Kemal Reis and the abduction of 2000 inhabitants. This treaty was renewed in 1513 and 1521. All supplies of grain from Nauplia and Monemvasia had to be imported from Turkish possessions, while corsairs rendered dangerous all traffic by sea.

In 1537, sultan Suleiman declared war upon Venice and his admiral Hayreddin Barbarossa devastated much of the Ionian Islands, and in October invaded the island of Aegina. On the fourth day Paliachora was captured, but the Latin church of St George was spared. Hayreddin Barbarossa had the adult male population massacred and took away 6,000 surviving women and children as slaves.

=== First Ottoman period (1540–1687) ===
With the peace of 1540, Venice ceded Nauplia (including Aegina) and Monemvasia. In 1579, the island was repopulated by Greeks form the mainland and a small number Albanians. The Albanians settled in the southwest of the island in the village of Perdika and would eventually assimilate into the Greek population. The island was attacked and left desolate by Francesco Morosini during the Cretan War (1654).

=== Second Venetian period (1687–1715) ===
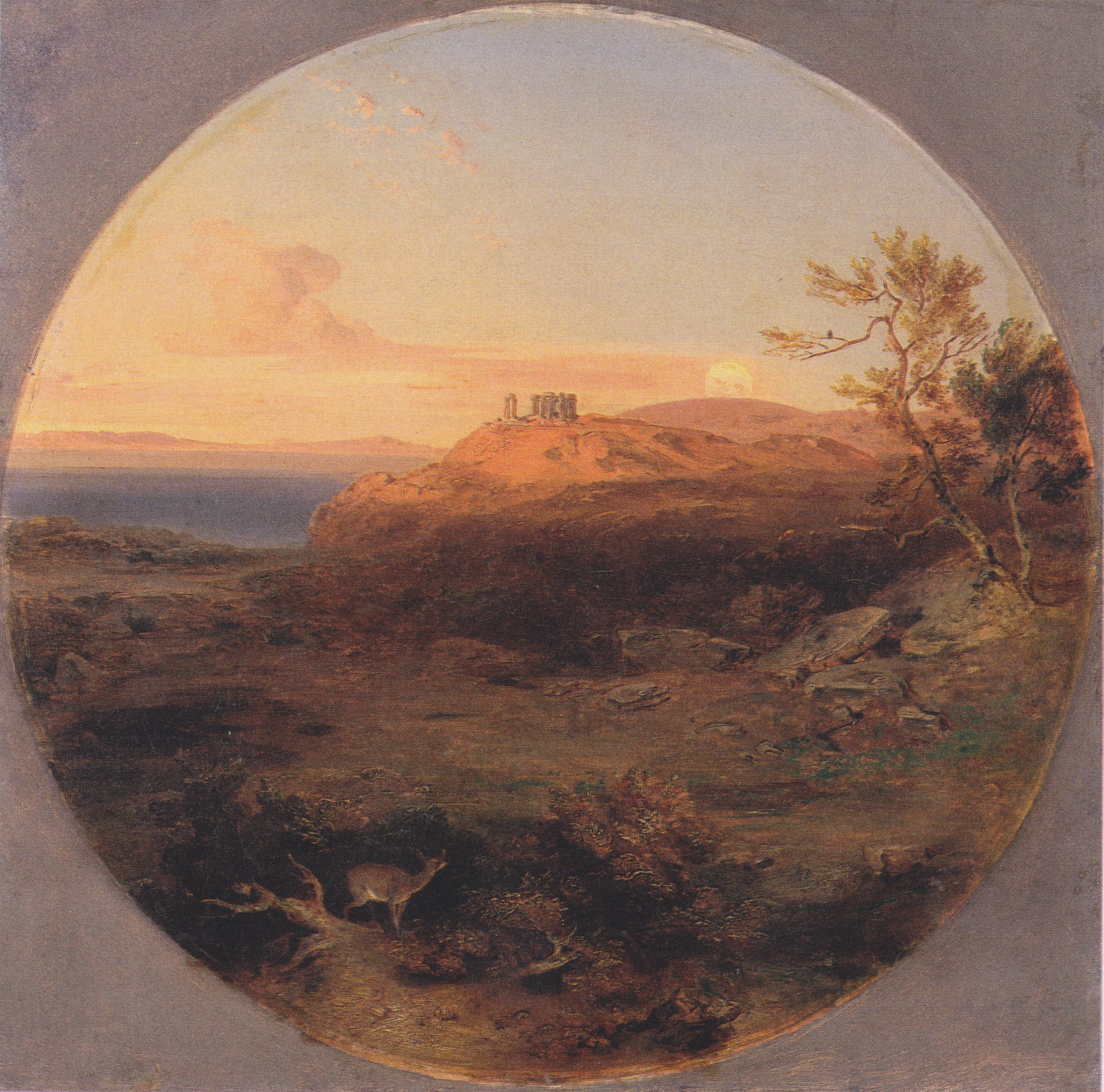
Aegina in 1845, by Carl Rottmann.

In 1684, the beginning of the Morean War between Venice and the Ottoman Empire resulted in the temporary reconquest of a large part of the country by the Republic. In 1687 the Venetian army arrived in Piraeus and captured Attica. The number of the Athenians at that time exceeded 6,000, whilst in 1674 the population of Aegina did not seem to exceed 3,000 inhabitants, two thirds of which were women. The Aeginetans had been reduced to poverty to pay their taxes. A significant plague epidemic began in Attica during 1688, an occasion that caused the massive migration of Athenians toward the south; most of them settled in Aegina. In 1693 Morosini resumed command, but his only acts were to refortify the castle of Aegina, which he had demolished during the Cretan war in 1655, the cost of upkeep being paid as long as the war lasted by the Athenians, and to place it and Salamis under Malipiero as Governor. This caused the Athenians to send him a request for the renewal of Venetian protection and an offer of an annual tribute. He died in 1694 and Zeno was appointed at his place.

In 1699, thanks to English mediation, the war ended with the peace of Karlowitz by which Venice retained possession of the 7 Ionian islands as well as Butrinto and Parga, the Morea, Spinalonga and Suda, Tenos, Santa Maura and Aegina and ceased to pay a tribute for Zante, but which restored Lepanto to the Ottoman sultan. Cerigo and Aegina were united administratively since the peace with Morea, which not only paid all the expenses of administration but furnished a substantial balance for the naval defense of Venice, in which it was directly interested.

=== Second Ottoman period (1715–1821) ===
During the early part of the Ottoman–Venetian War of 1714–1718 the Ottoman Fleet commanded by Canum Hoca captured Aegina. Ottomans rule in Aegina and the Morea was resumed and confirmed by the Treaty of Passarowitz, and they retained control of the island with the exception of a brief Russian occupation Orlov Revolt (early 1770s), until the beginning of the Greek War of Independence in 1821.

Throughout the 19th century, most Aeginitans spoke a distinct Greek dialect known as Old Athenian, which was also found in neighboring Megara and Athens. A very small minority of Arvanites lived on the island, who were bilingual in Arvanitika and Greek (spoken more by men and less by women), up until the early 20th century.

=== Greek Revolution ===
During the Greek War of Independence, Aegina became an administrative center for the Greek revolutionary authorities. Ioannis Kapodistrias was briefly established here.

=== Modern times ===
In the 19th century, pistachio production was introduced to island, with great success. In current times, Aegina is a popular tourist destination and there has been a construction boom of vacation homes.

== Landmarks ==
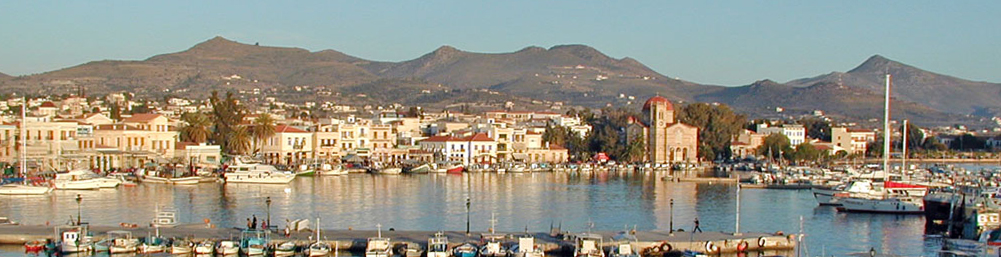
Panorama of Aegina's port.

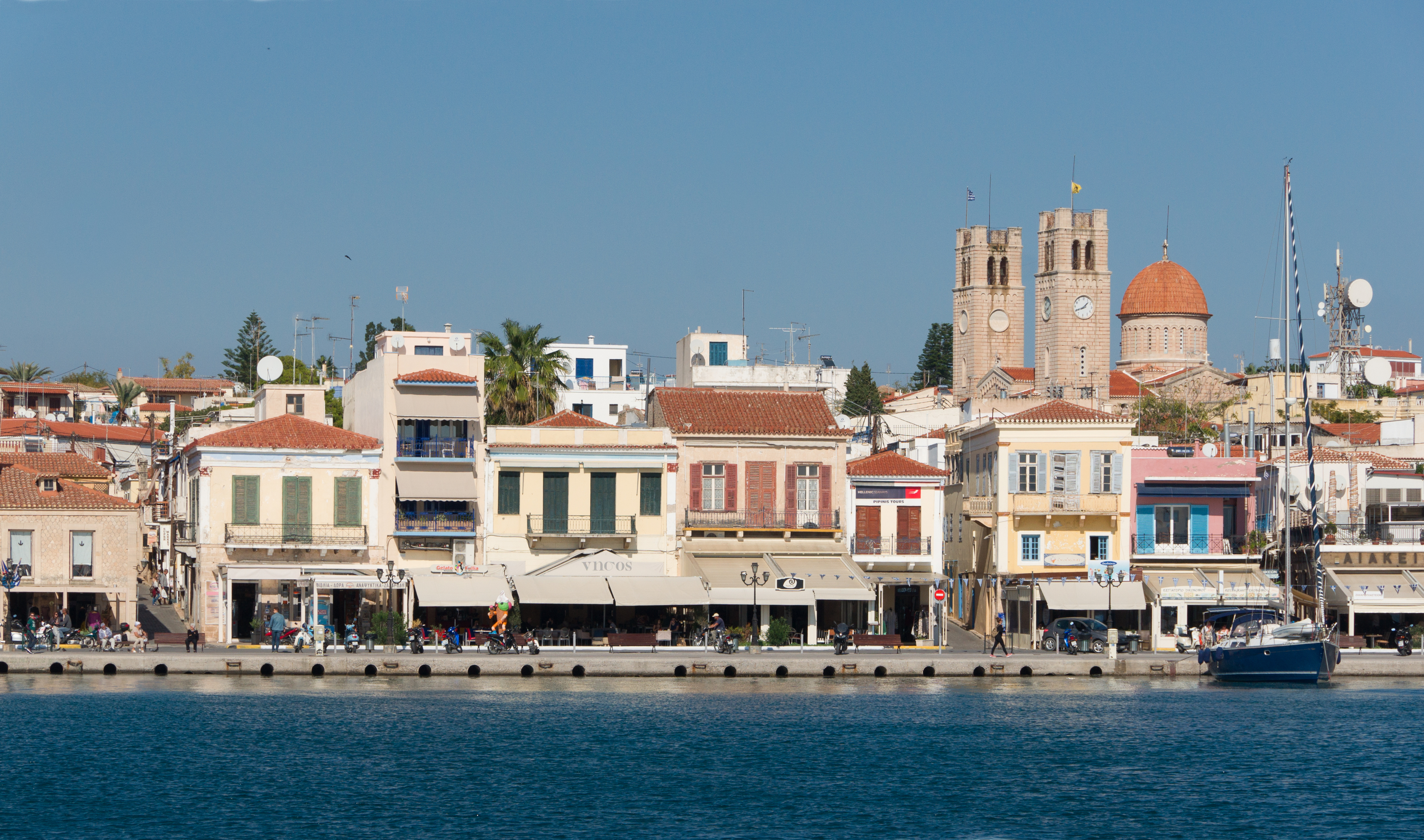
View of the port.

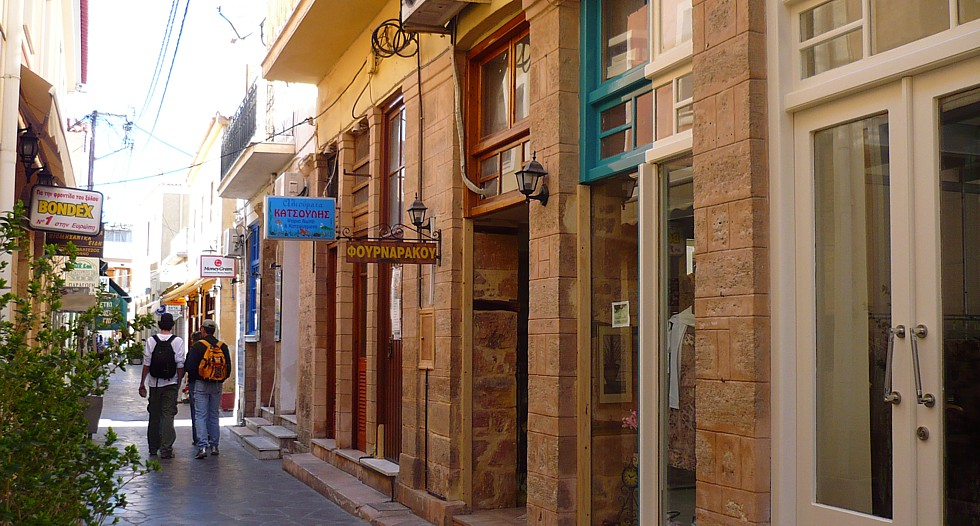
Traditional street in the town

The cathedral of Saint Nectarios of Aegina.

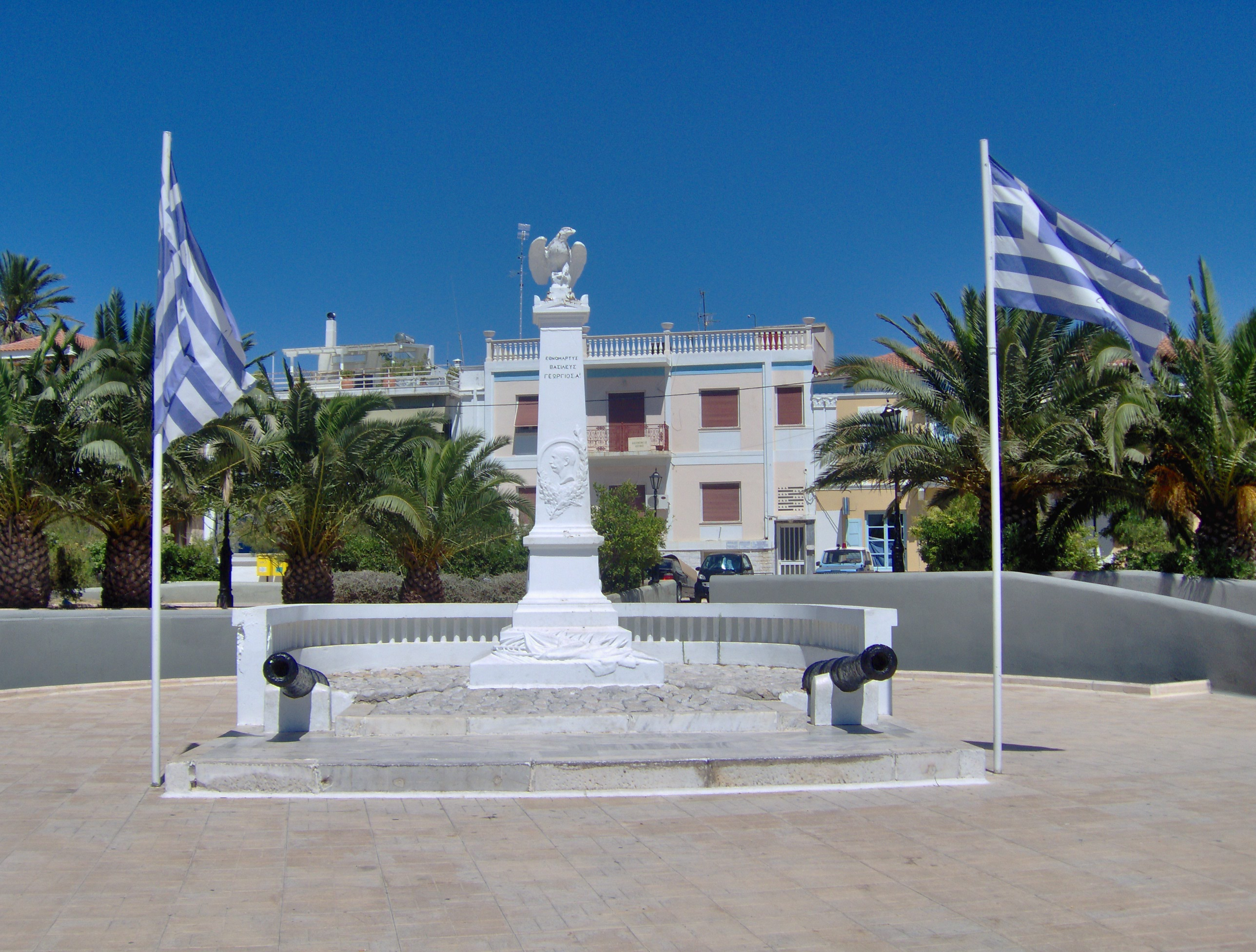
Aegina town centre.

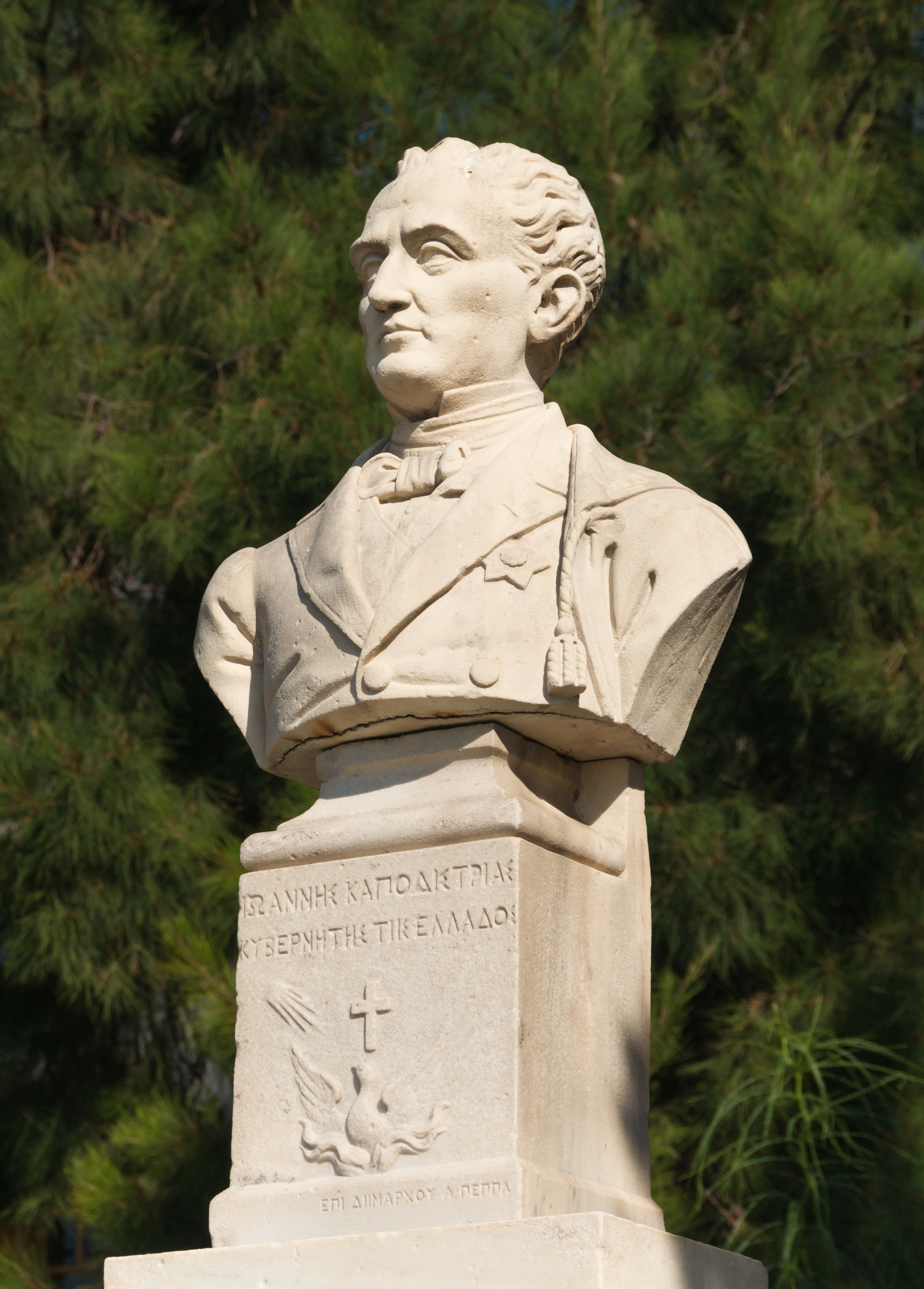
A bust of Kapodistrias

- Temple of Aphaea, dating from about 490 BC, it is the oldest surviving temple in Greece. It was dedicated to its namesake, a goddess who was later associated with Athena; the temple was part of an equilateral holy triangle of temples including the Athenian Parthenon and the temple of Poseidon at Sounion.
- Monastery of Agios Nectarios, dedicated to Nectarios of Aegina, a recent saint of the Greek Orthodox Church.
- A statue in the principal square commemorates Ioannis Kapodistrias (1776–1831), the first administrator of free modern Greece.
- The Orphanage of Kapodistrias is a large building, known locally as The Prison (Οι Φυλακές, Oi Filakes), constructed in 1828–29 by Ioannis Kapodistrias as a home for children orphaned as a result of the Greek War of Independence. The building also housed schools, vocational workshops, the National Public Library, the National Archaeological Museum, a military academy, the National Printing Office and the National Conservatory for Choir and Orchestra. From about 1880 it was used as a prison, and housed political prisoners during the Greek Junta (1967–1974) - hence its local name. There are currently plans to restore the building as a museum.
- The Tower of Markellos was probably built during the second Venetian occupation, 1687–1714, as a watch tower in anticipation of a Turkish siege. A castle, fortified walls and numerous watchtowers were built at this time. The tower was abandoned after the Turkish occupation of 1714, until revolutionary leader Spyros Markellos bought the tower as his residence in around 1802. In 1826-28 it was the headquarters of the temporary government of the embryonic Greek state. It subsequently was used as a police headquarters and housed various government agencies until it was abandoned again in the mid 19th century. It is currently owned by the Municipality of Aegina.
- Temple of Zeus Hellanios, near the village of Pachia Rachi, is a 13th-century Byzantine church, built on the ruins of the ancient temple to Zeus Hellanios, built in the 4th century BC. The staircase leading up to the church, some of the original walls, and loose stones from the earlier temple remain.
- Colona, Located to the north of the town of Aegina. Acropolis with the sanctuary of Apollo and Byzantine settlement. The name Colona was given by the Venetian sailors, who used the columns of the pavilion of the Doric temple of Apollo (6x11 columns) as a sign of orientation. The foundations and one column from the rear building are preserved. The temple with the buildings related to the function of the sanctuary dominates the ancient acropolis on the hill. It was built at the end of the 6th century when Aegina, one of the most important commercial centers, emerged as a rival of Athens. Excavations from the 19th century onwards made it clear that the architectural remains of the archaic-Hellenistic acropolis, which are only partially preserved, are based on the impressive buildings of the prehistoric era, with at least ten successive building phases.
- Paliachora, known as "the Mystras of Aegina," an abandoned city which was the main settlement on the island in Byzantine and Venetian times. Over 35 churches survive, many decorated with wall paintings from the 17th and 18th centuries or earlier.

== Economy ==
In 1896, the physician Nikolaos Peroglou introduced the systematic cultivation of pistachios, which soon became popular among the inhabitants of the island. By 1950, pistachio cultivation had significantly displaced the rest of the agricultural activity due to its high profitability but also due to the phylloxera that threatened the vineyards that time. As a result, in the early 60s, the first pistachio peeling factory was established in the Plakakia area by Grigorios Konidaris. The quality of "Fistiki Aeginis" (Aegina Pistachios), a name that was established as a product of Protected Designation of Origin (PDO) in 1996, is considered internationally excellent and superior to several foreign varieties, due to the special climatic conditions of the island (drought) as well as soil's volcanic characteristics. Pistachios have made Aegina famous all over the world. Today, half of the pistachio growers are members of the Agricultural Cooperative of Aegina's Pistachio Producers. It is estimated that pistachio cultivation covers 29,000 acres of the island while the total production reaches 2,700 tons per year. In recent years, in mid-September, the Pistachio Festival has been organized every year under the name "Fistiki Fest".

== Culture ==
=== Mythology ===
In Greek mythology, Aegina was a daughter of the river god Asopus and the nymph Metope. She bore at least two children: Menoetius by Actor, and Aeacus by the god Zeus. When Zeus abducted Aegina, he took her to Oenone, an island close to Attica. Here, Aegina gave birth to Aeacus, who would later become king of Oenone; thenceforth, the island's name was Aegina.

Aegina was the gathering place of Myrmidons; in Aegina they gathered and trained. Zeus needed an elite army and at first thought that Aegina, which at the time did not have any villagers, was a good place. So he changed some ants (Ancient Greek: Μυρμύγια, Myrmigia) into warriors who had six hands and wore black armour. Later, the Myrmidons, commanded by Achilles, were known as the most fearsome fighting unit in Greece.

=== Famous Aeginetans ===
- Aeacus, the first king of Aegina according to mythology, in whose honour the Aeacea were celebrated
- Smilis (6th century BC), sculptor
- Sostratus of Aegina (6th century BC), merchant
- Onatas (5th century BC), sculptor
- Ptolichus (5th century BC), sculptor
- Philiscus of Aegina (4th century BC), Cynic philosopher
- Paul of Aegina (7th century), medical scholar and physician
- Saint Athanasia of Aegina (9th century), abbess and saint
- Theodora of Thessaloniki (9th century), nun and saint
- Cosmas II Atticus (12th century), Patriarch of Constantinople
- Nectarios of Aegina (1846–1920), bishop and saint
- Aristeidis Moraitinis (aviator) born 1891, died 1918
- Gustav Hasford, American military journalist and novelist, moved to Aegina and died there of heart failure on 29 January 1993, aged 45

== Historical population ==
Year	Town population	Municipal/Island population
1981	6,730	11,127
1991	6,373	11,639
2001	7,410	13,552
2011	7,253	13,056
2021	6,633	12,911

== See also ==
- Aeginetan Commemoration
- Flag of Aegina

== Sources ==
- Welter Gabriel, Aigina, Archäol. Inst. d. Deutschen Reiches, Berlin 1938.
- Christides, Vassilios (1981), "The Raids of the Moslems of Crete in the Aegean Sea: Piracy and Conquest", Byzantion, 51: 76–111
- Kazhdan, Alexander, ed. (1991). The Oxford Dictionary of Byzantium. Oxford and New York: Oxford University Press. ISBN 0-19-504652-8.
- Miller William, Essays on the Latin orient, Rome 1921 (reprint: Amsterdam 1964).Essays on the Latin Orient
- Miller William, "Η Παληαχώρα της Αιγίνης. Ηρημωμένη ελληνική πόλις", Νέος Ελληνομνήμων Κ΄ (1926), p. 363–365.Wayback Machine
- Rubio y Lluch A., "Συμβολαί εις την ιστορίαν των Καταλωνίων εν Ελλάδι", Δελτίον της Ιστορικής και Εθνολογικής Εταιρείας της Ελλάδος Β΄(1883), p. 458–466.
- Lambros Spyridon ed., Έγγραφα αναφερόμενα εις την μεσαιωνικήν ιστορίαν των Αθηνών, Athens 1906.
- D' Olwer Nic., Les seigneurs Catalans d' Egine, τόμος εις μνήμην του Σπυρίδωνος Λάμπρου, Athens 1935.
- Koulikourdi Georgia, Αίγινα, 2 vols., Athens 1990.
- Μεσσίνας, Ηλίας, Οι Συναγωγές της Θεσσαλονίκης και της Βέροιας, Aθήνα 1997. ISBN 960-336-010-4.
- Messinas, Elias, The Synagogues of Greece: A Study of Synagogues in Macedonia and Thrace: With Architectural Drawings of all Synagogues of Greece. Seattle 2022. ISBN 979-8-8069-0288-8
- Μεσσίνας, Ηλίας, H Συναγωγή, Αθήνα: Εκδόσεις Ινφογνώμων 2022. ISBN 978-618-5590-21-5
- Moutsopoulos Nikolaos, Η Παλιαχώρα της Αιγίνης. Ιστορική και μορφολογική εξέτασις των μνημείων, Athens 1962.
- Nikoloudis Nikolaos .:BiblioNet : Νικολούδης, Νικόλαος Γ., "Η Αίγινα κατά τον Μεσαίωνα και την Τουρκοκρατία", Βυζαντινός Δόμος 7(1993–94), pp:13–21.
- Pennas Charalambos .:BiblioNet : Πέννας, Χαράλαμπος, The Byzantine Aegina.:BiblioNet : Byzantine Aegina / Πέννας, Χαράλαμπος, Athens 2004.
- John N. Koumanoudes .:BiblioNet : Κουμανούδης, Ιωάννης Ν., Ανεμομυλικά ΙΙ, Αγκίστρι, Αίγινα, Αστυπάλαια, Λήμνος, Σαλαμίνα, Σπέτσες, Σύμη, Χίος και Ψαρά.:BiblioNet : Ανεμομυλικά ΙΙ / Κουμανούδης, Ιωάννης Ν., Τεχνικό Επιμελητήριο Ελλάδας, 2010.
