= Xoanon =

Archaic wooden cult image of Ancient Greece

The last three xoana figures known today, discovered in Palma di Montechiaro, 7th–6th century B.C (Paolo Orsi Archaeological Museum, Syracuse)

A xoanon (/ˈzoʊ.ənɒn/, Greek: ξόανον; plural: Greek: ξόανα xoana, from the verb Greek: ξέειν, xeein, to carve or scrape [wood]) was a wooden cult image from Archaic Greece. Classical Greeks associated such cult objects, whether aniconic or effigy, with the legendary Daedalus. Many such cult images were preserved into historical times and later reproduced in stone or marble copies, but only three of them have survived to the modern day.

In the 2nd century CE, Pausanias described numerous xoana in his Description of Greece, notably the image of Hera in her temple at Samos: "The statue of the Samian Hera, as Aethilos [sic] (Note: The name Aethilos in the available text is thought to be a mis-spelling of Aethlios.) says, was a wooden beam at first, but afterwards, when Prokles was ruler, it was humanized in form". In Pausanias' travels he never mentions seeing a xoanon of a "mortal man".

== Types of xoana ==
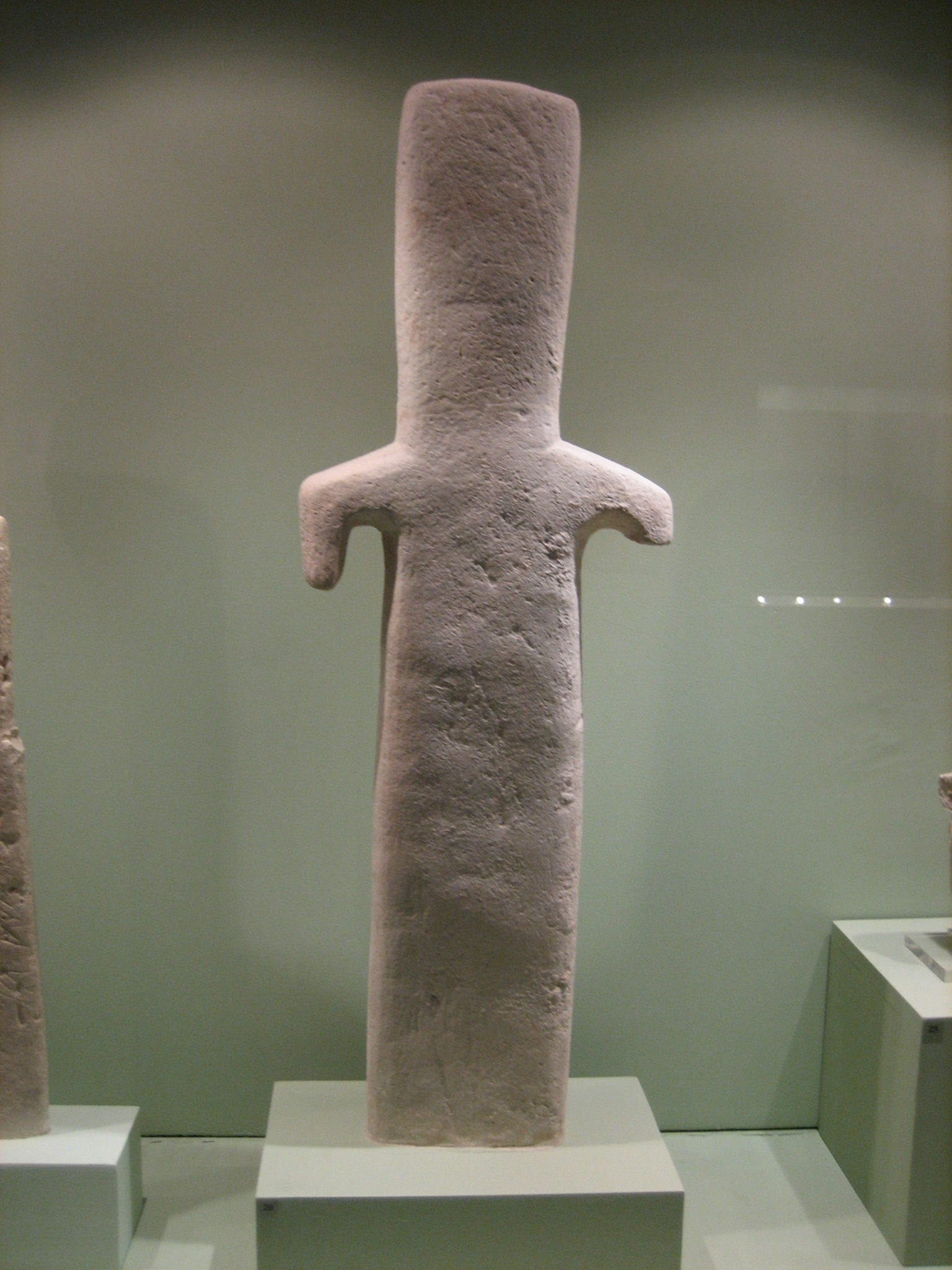
"Plank figure" of chalk, Early Cypriot III to Middle Cypriot I, 1900-1800 BCE (Goulandris Museum of Cycladic Art, Athens)

Some types of archaic xoana may be reflected in archaic marble versions, such as the pillar-like "Hera of Samos" (Louvre Museum), the flat "Hera of Delos" or some archaic kouros-type figures that may have been used to represent Apollo.

A different type of cult figure in which the face, hands, and feet were carved of marble and the rest of the body made of wood is called acrolith. The wooden part was usually covered either with cloth or gold leaf.

== Woods and textiles ==
For Strabo, the "carved" xoanon might also be of ivory; (Note: Thus Strabo describes the chryselephantine sculptures of Phidian Zeus and Polyclitan Hera as xoana, and even the marble Nemesis at Rhamnus, as Frazer noted (Frazer 1897).) Pausanias, however, always uses xoanon in its strict sense, to denote a wooden image; at Corinth Pausanias noted that "The sanctuary of Athena Chalinitis is by the theater, and near it is a naked xoanon of Herakles, said to be by Daidalos. All the works of this artist, though somewhat uncouth to look at, nevertheless have a touch of the divine in them."

Of the works of Daidalos there are two in Boeotia, a Herakles in Thebes and the Trophonios at Lebadeia. There are also two other xoana in Crete, a Britomartis at Olous and an Athena at Knossos. ... At Delos, too, there is a small xoanon of Aphrodite, its right hand damaged by time, and instead of feet its lower part is square. (Note: Compare the image of the "Lady of Ephesus" whom the Greeks called Artemis: Temple of Artemis at Ephesus.) I am persuaded that Ariadne got this image from Daidalos.

— Pausanias, 9.40.3

Similar xoana were ascribed by the Greeks to the contemporary of Daedalus, the equally legendary Smilis. Such figures were often clothed in real textiles, such as the peplos that was woven and ceremonially delivered to Athena on the Acropolis of Athens into historic times.

The wood of which a xoanon was carved was often symbolic: olivewood, (Note: The olive is sacred to Athena.) pearwood, Vitex, oak, (Note: The oak is especially sacred to Zeus.) are all specifically mentioned.

In Athens, in the Erechtheum, an ancient olivewood effigy of Athena was preserved. The Athenians believed it had fallen to earth from the heavens, as a gift to Athens; it was still to be seen in the 2nd century CE. On the island of Icaria a rustic piece of wood was venerated for the spirit of Artemis it contained or represented (Burkert). (Note: Ovid describes how in the cave of Cybele numerous wooden images are to be seen in Ovid. Metamorphoses. 10.693 ff..)

== Copies of venerable images ==
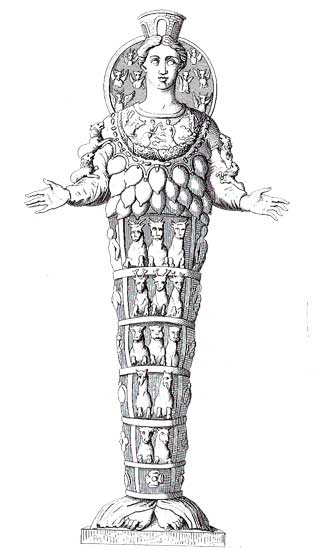
Synthesizing the Lady of Ephesus as Diana Aventina: a Roman marble copy of a Greek replica of a lost Geometric period xoanon (18th-century engraving)

The importance of the xoanon in local cult ensured that it would be carefully copied when colonies were founded, and sent out with the colonists from the mother-city.

Strabo (4.1) reports that the metropolis Massilia (modern Marseille) was founded by Phocaeans. Their cult of Artemis of Ephesus was transferred with the colony, justified in the founding myth by a dream, and the artistic design of the cult image — Strabo uses the term diathesis (Greek διάθεσις) — was re-exported to Massiliote sub-colonies, "where they keep the diathesis of the xoanon the same, and all the other usages precisely the same as is customary in the mother-city".

Similarly, cementing cultural ties between the Phocaean colony at Massilia and the Phocaean community in Rome, "Among the others, the Romans have consecrated Artemis' xoanon on the Aventine, taking the same model from the Massiliotes" (Strabo, 4.1.5). So the cult image of the Lady of Ephesus, identified as Artemis in Greek understanding, was established as Diana Aventina at Rome, of whom marble copies survive (see illustration at right).

== See also ==
- Anthropomorphic wooden cult figurines of Central and Northern Europe
- Daidala
- Cycladic art

== Citations ==
=== Sources ===
- Burkert, Walter (1985). Greek Religion. II.5.3 Temple and Cult Image.
- Donohue, A. A. (1988). Xoana and the Origins of Greek Sculpture.
- Pausanias. Description of Greece, translation and commentary. Translated by Frazer, James George. II, pages 69–70.
- Stewart, Andrew. One Hundred Greek Sculptors: Their Careers and Extant Works.
