= Portes, Aegina =

Greek fishing village

Portes (Greek: Πόρτες) is a Greek fishing village located on the east side of Aegina. It is about 28 km from the main town of Aegina.

Behind the village is an agricultural plain with hills on the edges. There is a tiny harbour with fishing boats surrounded by a rocky mole. The shore and sea bed are pebbly.

The inhabitants of the village live mainly on fishing and tourism. The landscape and the wild beauty attracts visitors.

It is said that Portes suffered from the activities of the Ottoman pirate Barbarossa, so they built houses without windows, only with doors (portes or πόρτες in Greek) which is the origin of the name of the village. A second explanation is that the name Portes comes from the word porto (i.e. port) since the village has a port from which volcanic material, named Mavropetres, were loaded into ships that sailed to Crete.

There are fishing areas at Kavos Antoni. The area is ideal for scuba diving and underwater spearfishing.
