= Paliachora =

Coordinates: 37°45′03″N 23°29′22″E

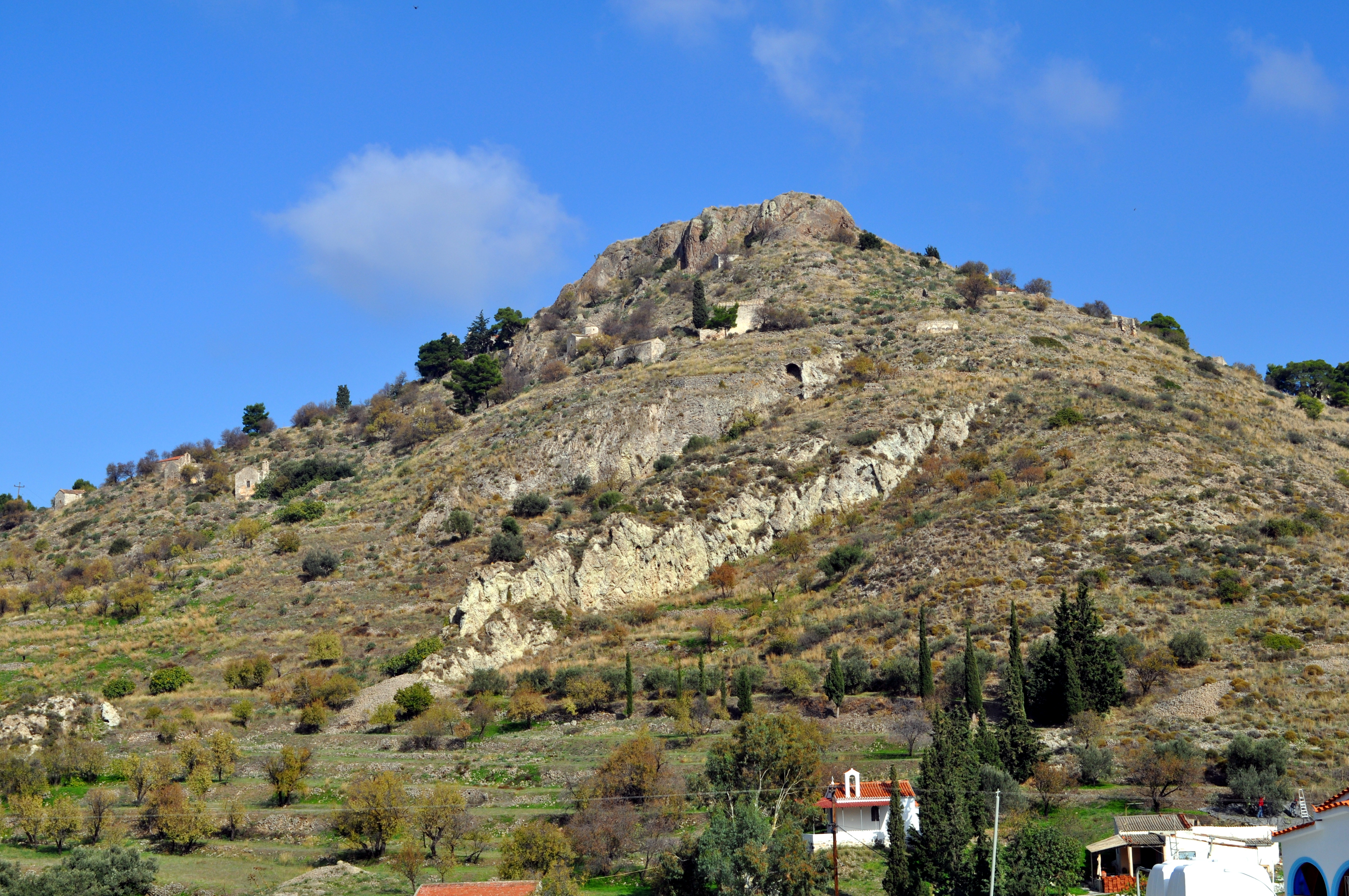
- Interactive map of the Paliachora area

Paliachora (Παλιαχώρα), also known as Palaia Chora (Παλαιά Χώρα) and Palaiochora (Παλαιοχώρα) is an abandoned Medieval settlement on Aegina, one of the islands off the coast of Attica in Greece. Paliachora was the main centre of habitation on the island from the Middle Byzantine period until the beginning of the 19th century. It was built on a peak in the northern part of the island, above the monastery of Agios Nektarios, next to the road from the city of Aigina on the west coast to Mesagros and the Temple of Aphaia in the east. It has been nicknamed the "Mystras of Aigina."

== History ==
The peak on which Paliachora is located has been identified with the ancient city of Oie, which is mentioned by Herodotus and Pausanias Periegetes. Two wooden statues dedicated to Auxesia and Damia (equivalent to Demeter and Persephone) were brought to Oie by the Aiginetans from Epidaurus and festivals were celebrated there in their honour. Remains of buildings from ancient and early Christian times have been found in the area of Paliachora.

Continuous pirate raids on Aegina in the Middle Ages led the inhabitants of the island to abandon the coastal areas and resettle at Paliachora, a strong point in the interior of the island. Moustopoulos reckoned that the abandonment of the coasts happened in the 9th century AD, following damage to Lygourio and Attica by Saracen pirates, perhaps after the raid of 896 AD, in which Aegina itself was attacked. In 1204, after the Fourth Crusade, Aegina passed into the Venetian empire, but it is later found under the control of the Duchy of Athens. In 1296 it was given as a dowry to Boniface of Verona. In 1394, it is found in the domain of the Caopena family. Aegina returned to the Venetian empire in 1451. In the middle of the 15th century, the construction of a castle was begun on the summit of Paliachora. In 1462, the Venetians removed the skull of St. George which was then located in the Church of St. George the Catholic, from Aegina and transferred it to Venice.

In 1537, Hayreddin Barbarossa besieged Aegina and took it after four days. He demolished the houses of Paliachora and the inhabitants were either enslaved or massacred. In 1540, Aegina came under the control of the Ottoman Empire and Paliachora was resettled, again due to the threat of piracy. Pirate attacks led the Venetians under the leadership of Francisco Morozini to besiege Paliachora for eight days. Then he fled, taking 300–600 Albanians and 40 Turkish inhabitants of the settlement with him. The Venetians captured the island again in 1687, but the Ottomans regained it in 1715. In 1765, the town consisted of some four hundred houses.

At the beginning of the 19th century, as piratical activity declined, the inhabitants of Paliachora gradually abandoned it and resettled at the modern township of Aegina on the west coast of the island.

== Description ==
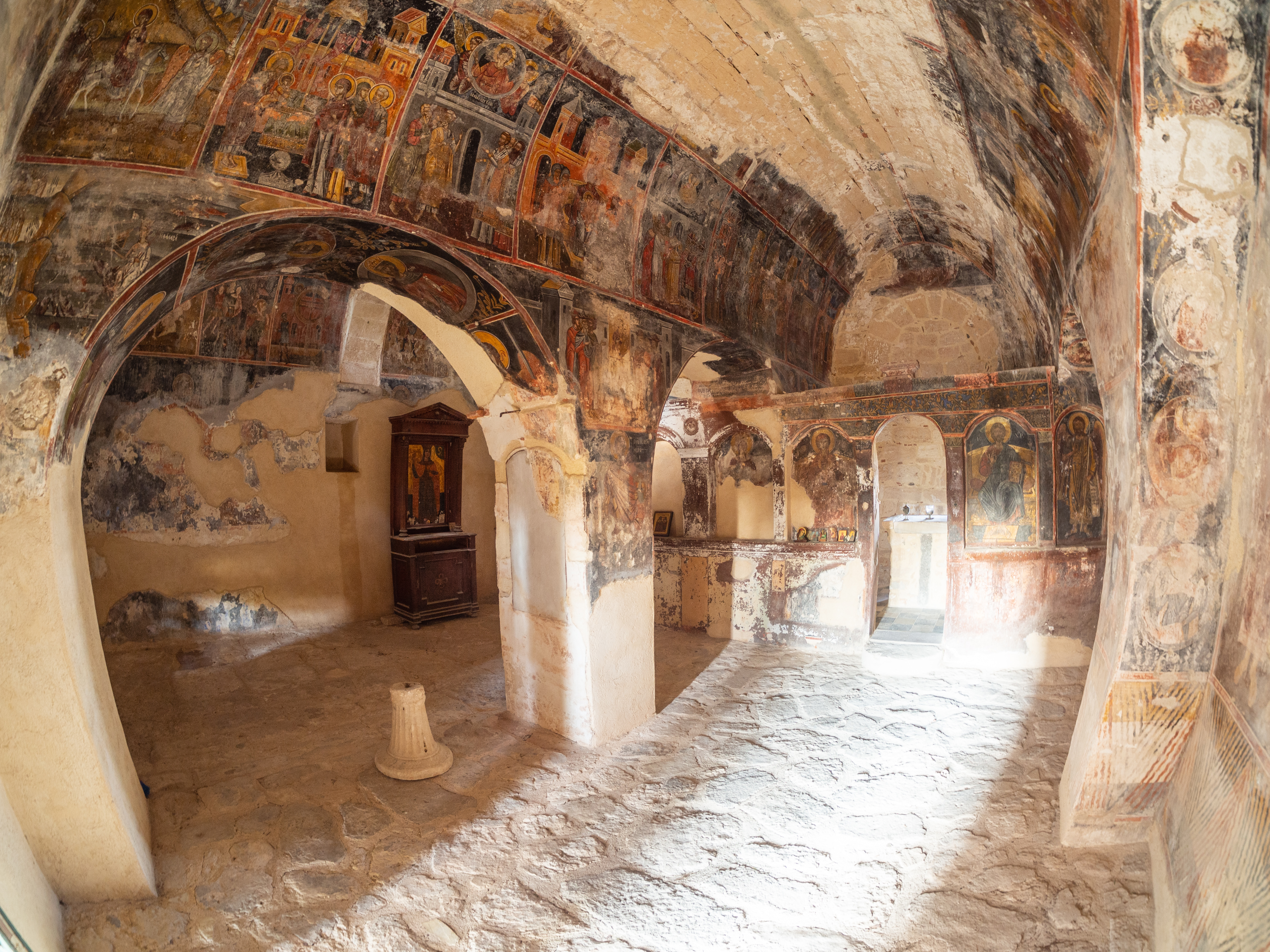
Interior of the Church of St. Cyriaca

Paliachora covers the east, south and west slopes of the peak. The north side was uninhabited, so that the settlement could not be seen from the sea. On top of the peak, at a height of 355 metres, was the castle of Paliachora. The south and west sides of it were naturally defended by the steep slope of the cliff. The entrances to the castle were located on the north and east sides and it communicated with the rest of the settlement through them. Some remains of the walls of the castle are preserved to a height of 1.8 metres. There are also remains of three cisterns and ruins of other structures. The settlement was packed with small houses and churches. It is divided by two main roads, which led up to the castle. Today, very few of the houses are preserved even as foundations, but 38 Byzantine and post-Byzantine churches are preserved, many of which still retain their internal wall paintings.

== List of churches ==
List of churches
Name	Image	Date
St. Anne; Αγία Άννα		17th century
St. Athanasios; Άγιος Αθανάσιος		18th century
St. Barbara; Αγία Βαρβάρα		16th century
St. Catherine; Ναός Αγίας Αικατερίνης		17th century
St. Cyriaca and the life-giving spring Αγία Κυριακή και Ζωοδόχος Πηγή		15th – 16th century
St. Cryphte; Αγία Κρυφτή		16th century
Cathedral (St. Dionysios); Επισκοπή (Άγιος Διονύσιος)		14th – 15th century
St. Charalambos; Άγιος Χαράλαμπος		16th century
St. Cyriacus; Άγιος Κήρυκος		17th century
St. Demetrios; Άγιος Δημήτριος		17th century
St. Eleutherius; Άγιος Ελευθέριος		17th – 18th century
St. Euthymius; Άγιος Ευθύμιος		14th century
St. George; Άγιος Γεώργιος		17th – 18th century
St. George the Catholic / St. George in the Forum / Panagia Mesosporitissa / Panagia Phoritissa; Άγιος Γεώργιος ο Καθολικός / Παναγία η Μεσοσπορίτισσα / Παναγία η Φορίτισσα		13th – 14th century
St. George and Demetrios in the fortress Άγιος Γεώργιος και Δημήτριος Κάστρου		17th century
St. John the Theologian; Άγιος Ιωάννης ο Θεολόγος		Late 14th century
St. John the Forerunner; Άγιος Ιωάννης ο Πρόδρομος		17th century
St. Macrina; Αγία Μακρίνα		17th century
St. Menas; Άγιος Μηνάς		17th century
St. Nicholas; Άγιος Νικόλαος		ca. 1400
St. Nicholas the Bishop; Άγιος Νικόλαος Επισκοπής		18th century
St. Spyridon; Άγιος Σπυρίδωνας		16th century
St Stephen; Άγιος Στέφανος		17th – 18th century
St. Stylian; Άγιος Στυλιανός		17th century
St. Zachary; Άγιος Ζαχαρίας		16th century
Church of the Dormition of the Mother of God; Ναός Κοίμησης Θεοτόκου		17th century
Church of the Dormition of St. Anne; Ναός Κοιμήσεως Αγίας Άννης		17th century
Church of the Holy Unmercenaries; Ναός Αγίων Αναργύρων		17th century
Church of the Holy Theodori; Άγιοι Θεόδωροι		17th century
Church of the Metamorphosis; Ναός Μεταμορφώσεως		17th century
Church of the Precious Cross; Ναός Τιμίου Σταυρού		17th century
Church of the Taxiarch; Ταξιάρχης		13th century
Church of the Taxiarch Michael; Ταξιάρχης Μιχαήλ		14th century
Virgin of Giannouli; Παναγία του Γιάννουλη		15th century

== Gallery ==
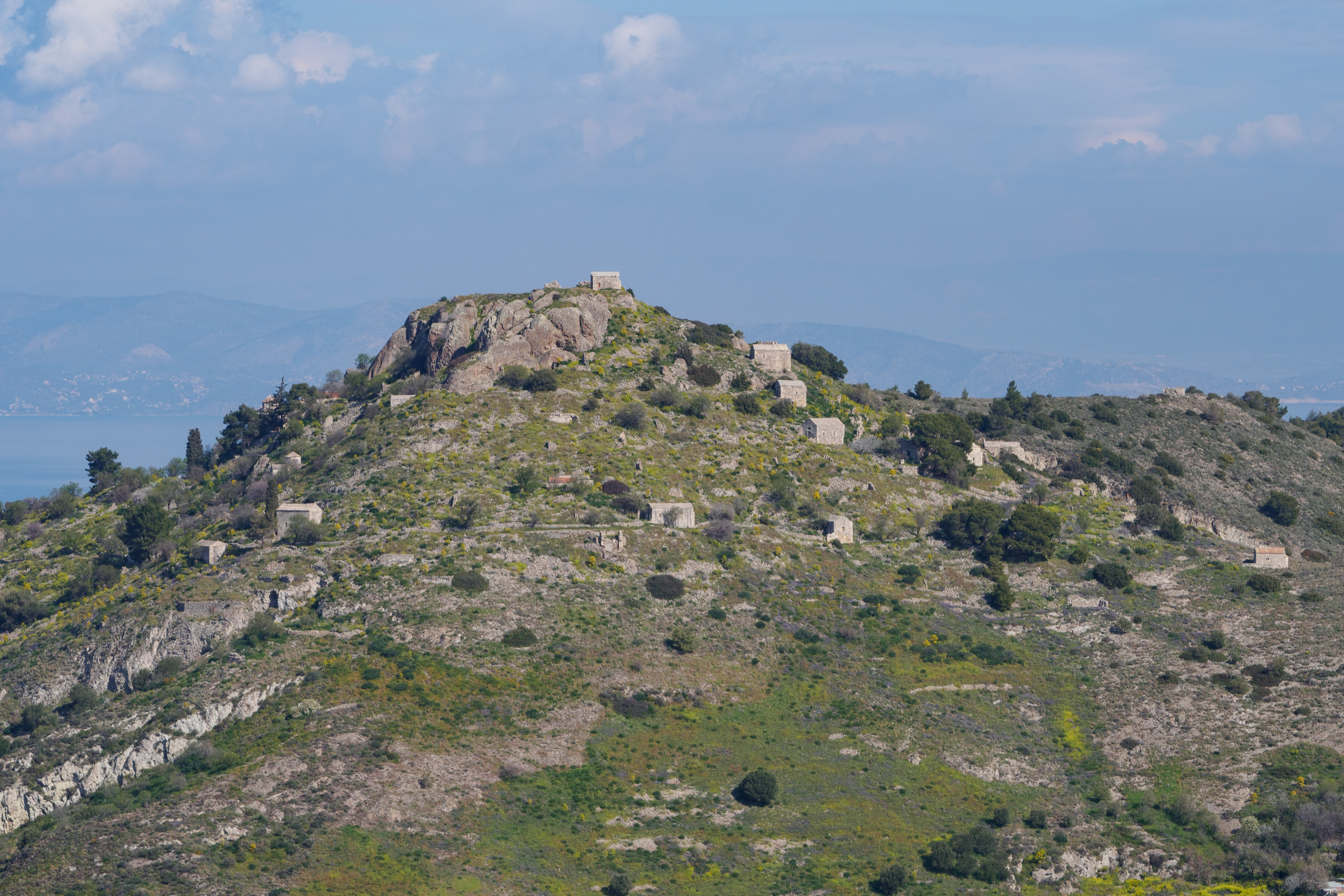
General view

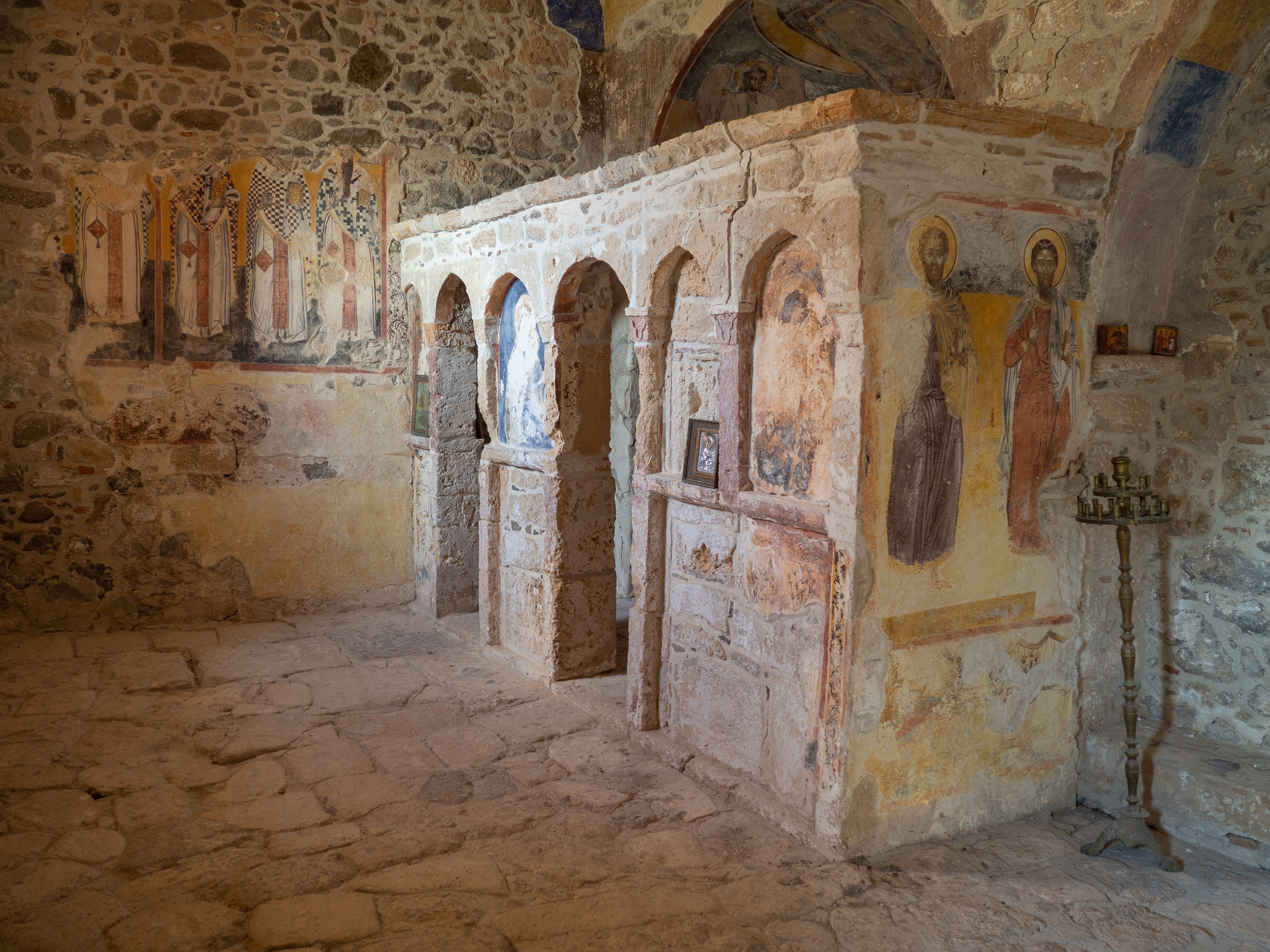
Interior of Agios Georgios in the Forum
