= Aeginetan Commemoration =

Ancient Greek ritual

The Aeginetan Commemoration (Ancient Greek: Αιγινητών εορτή) was an Ancient Greek ritual held by the people of Aegina in honor of Poseidon.

Plutarch, in his work "Greek Questions", notes that many Aeginetans who participated in the Trojan War were killed in battle, and even more were lost during their return due to storms. Only a few managed to return to Aegina. However, in the midst of widespread mourning, neither the survivors nor their relatives who received them felt it was appropriate to celebrate or offer public religious sacrifices. Thus, they secretly celebrated their return within their homes, without even the presence of servants.

In memory of this event, the Aeginetans celebrated a sacrifice to Poseidon, called the Thiasi, during which they would dine in silence, each family apart by itself, for the space of sixteen days, without the presence of slaves, and no outsiders were invited. After these sixteen days, they offered sacrifices to Aphrodite, thereby concluding this feast.

Due to this ritual, in ancient Greece, the inhabitants of other cities referred to the Aeginetans as Monophagi (those who eat alone). This term has survived in the modern Greek expression monofagas, which is commonly used to describe greedy individuals or those who do not allow others to participate in activities with economic benefits.

== Bibliography ==
- Plutarch (1874). "Chapter 44". Plutarch's Morals. Translated by William W. Goodwin. Press Of John Wilson and son. Boston: Little, Brown, and Company.
- Plutarch (1927–2004). "44". Moralia. The Greek Questions. Loeb Classical Library. Vol. 305. Translated by Babbitt, Frank Cole. et al. (16 vols ed.). Cambridge, Massachusetts: Harvard University Press. pp. 230–231.
