= Flag of Aegina =

Aegina
- Use: Small vexillological symbol or pictogram in black and white showing the different uses of the flag
- Proportion: 2:3

The Flag of Aegina is the flag used in Aegina island in Greece.

== Design ==
The flag of Aegina is diagonally divided by a white stripe, with the upper part blue with a blue cross outlined in white and the lower part red with a white fouled anchor. In the middle of the flag, a white disc is charged with a green turtle, the island's symbol in ancient Greece. Under the turtle is written ΝΗΣΟΣ ΑΙΓΙΝΑ (Nisos Aigina, Aegina Island) and the diagonal inscription says: ΑΙΓΙΝΑ: ΠΡΩΤΗ ΠΡΩΤΕΥΟΥΣΑ ΤΟΥ ΝΕΟΤΕΡΟΥ ΕΛΛΗΝΙΚΟΥ ΚΡΑΤΟΥΣ ("Aegina: First capital of the new Greek state"). The town of Aegina was indeed the first capital of Greece after the independence, even for about a month. The government then moved to Nafplio and finally to Athens.

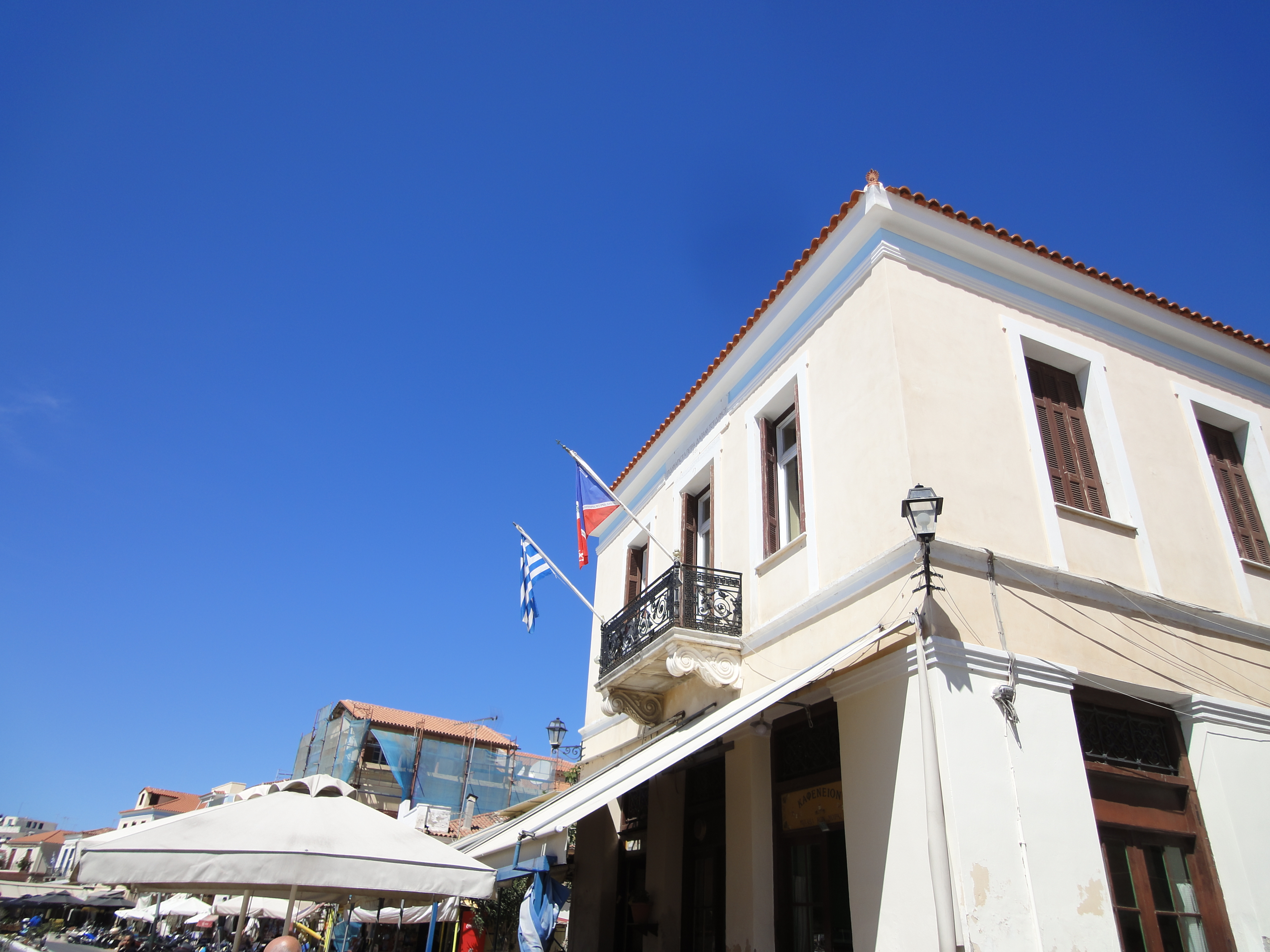
Flag flown outside Aegina's Town Hall
