= Amphicrates =

Ancient king of Samos

Amphicrates (Ancient Greek: Ἀμφικράτης) was an early king of Samos (fl. 700 BC or 600 BC or 550 BC). He is known only from a brief reference in Herodotus and his date is much disputed.

Herodotus mentions Amphicrates in passing to explain why the people of Aegina enslaved a group of Samian exiles around 525 BC. He says that they did this because they remembered that King Amphicrates of Samos had led an attack on Aegina in which he "did the Aeginetans great harm and suffered great harm in turn." There have been three proposals for the context of this event.

- The first was proposed by J. P. Barron and followed by Graham Shipley. They link the event with the Lelantine War waged between the Euboean cities of Chalcis and Eretria around 700 BC, in which Samos is meant to have supported the Chalcideans. It is not clear why this would lead to an invasion of Aegina. The date and even existence of the Lelantine War has been questioned in recent scholarship.
- T. J. Figueira and Aideen Carty proposed that Amphicrates' invasion of Aegina was connected to a conflict in which the Aeginetans attempted to win independence from Epidaurus, with the help of Periander of Corinth. Epidaurus was Samos' mother city and Amphicrates might have led an invasion in order to support the Epidaurians. This event would have taken place a little before 600 BC. Carty suggests that it explains an episode recorded without context in Herodotus, in which the Samians seized a convoy of slaves sent by Periander to King Alyattes of Lydia.
- G. Schmidt and Robert Drews propose the Amphicrates ruled in mid-sixth century BC, as the immediate predecessor of Polycrates of Samos. This proposal has found little support, because it does not seem possible to fit Amphicrates into what is known about the chronology of Samos in this period from other sources.

At some point, the Samian kingship was overthrown and replaced with an oligarchy ruled by a group called the Geomoroi ('land-sharers'). The date of Amphicrates is important, because he must pre-date this event. J. P. Barron and G. Shipley suggest that the Geomoroi overthrew the Samian in response to Amphicrates' failure on Aegina; but another source, Plutarch, says that the king that they overthrew was called Demoteles (perhaps Amphicrates' successor).

== Bibliography ==
- Barron, John P. (1964). "The Sixth-Century Tyranny at Samos". The Classical Quarterly. 14 (2): 210–229. doi:10.1017/S0009838800023764. JSTOR 637725.
- Schmidt, G. (1974). "Eine Brychon-Weihung und ihre Fundlage". Mitteilungen des Deutschen archäologischen Instituts zu Athen. 87: 165–185.
- Drews, R. (1983). Basileus: The Evidence for Kingship in Geometric Greece. Yale University Press. p. 28.
- Figueira, T. (1983). "Aeginetan independence". The Classical Journal. 79: 8–29.
- Shipley, Graham J. (1987). A History of Samos, 800-188 BC. Oxford: Oxford University Press. pp. 37–39. ISBN 9780198148685.
- Carty, Aideen (2015). Polycrates, Tyrant of Samos: New Light on Archaic Greece. Stuttgart: Franz Steiner Verlag. pp. 25–28. ISBN 9783515108980.
