= Kastri, Cythera =

Coordinates: 36.2672°N 22.9811°E

Kastri is a village in the island of Cythera, Islands regional unit, Greece. Kastri has been occupied by humans since the Bronze Age, and was an important settlement of the Early Helladic/Minoan Period of Crete. Kastri is thought to have been an early settlement of Minoan Crete. Kastri on Cythera is considerably but directly north of the ancient site of Kydonia, which was the major northwestern Cretan ancient city.

== See also ==
- Kydonia
