= Smilis =

Legendary Ancient Greek sculptor

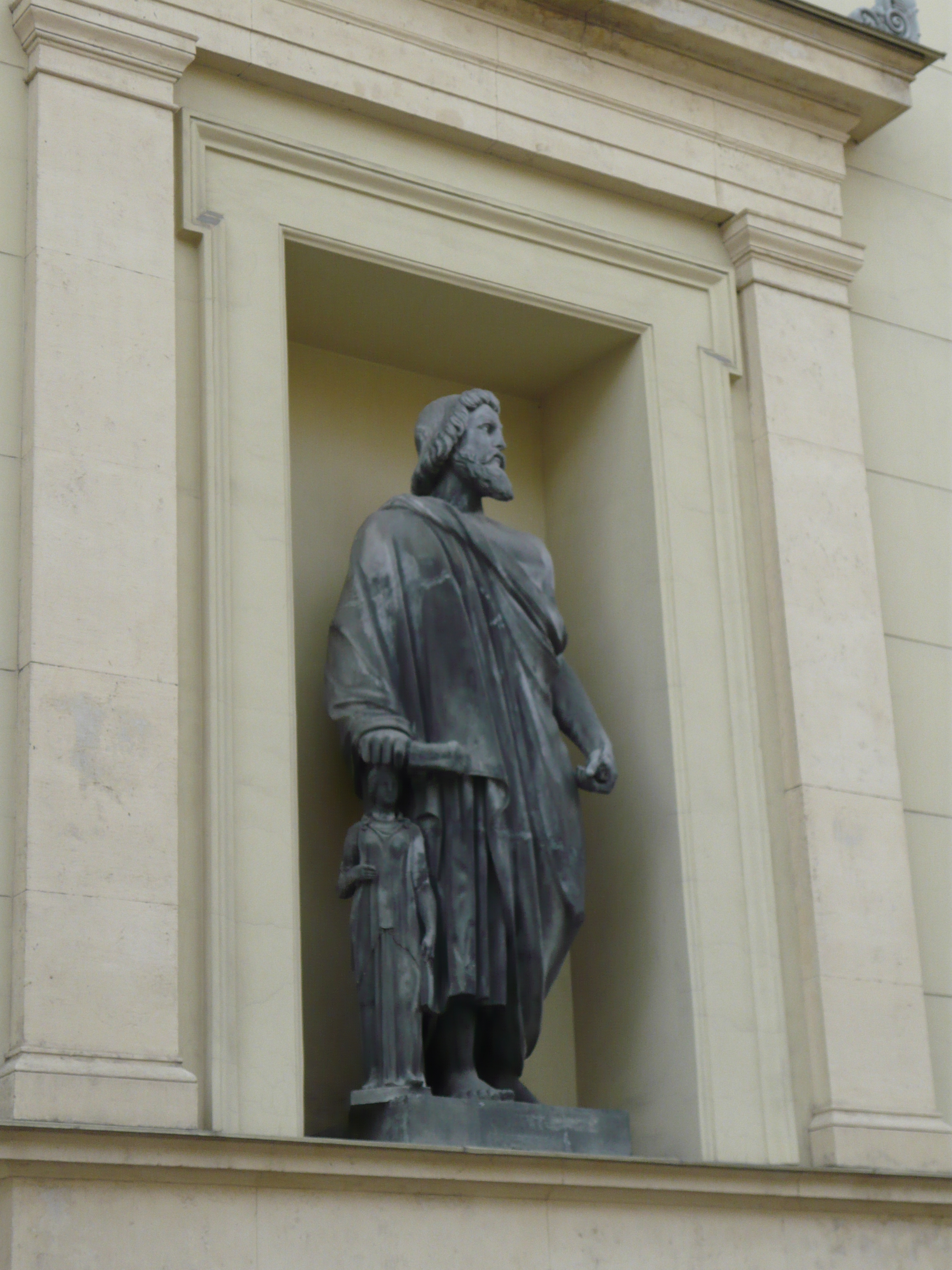
Statue of Smilis on the facade of the New Hermitage Building in St Petersburg, Russia

Smilis (Ancient Greek: Σμῖλις), was a legendary ancient Greek sculptor, the contemporary of Daedalus, whose name was associated with the archaic cult figure at the Heraion of Samos. Smilis was born on the island of Aegina and his father was named Euclides. He was the legendary head of the Aeginetan School of sculpture.
