= Hydraulic engineering =

Sub-discipline of civil engineering

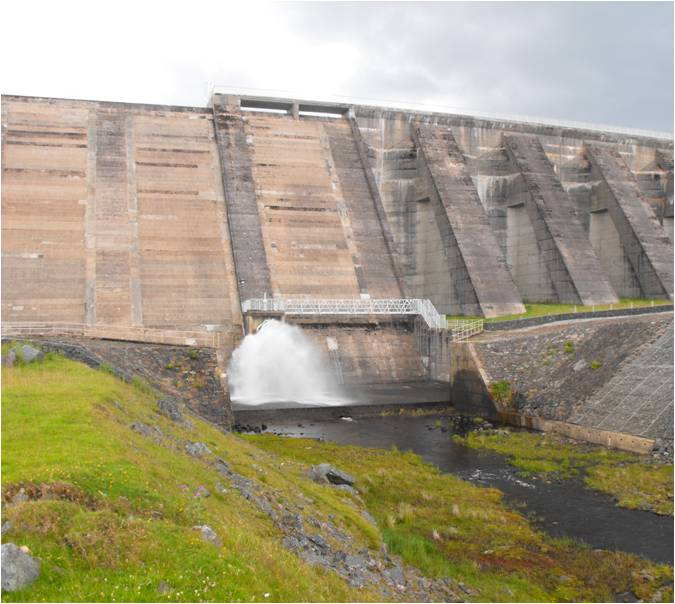
Hydraulic Flood Retention Basin (HFRB)

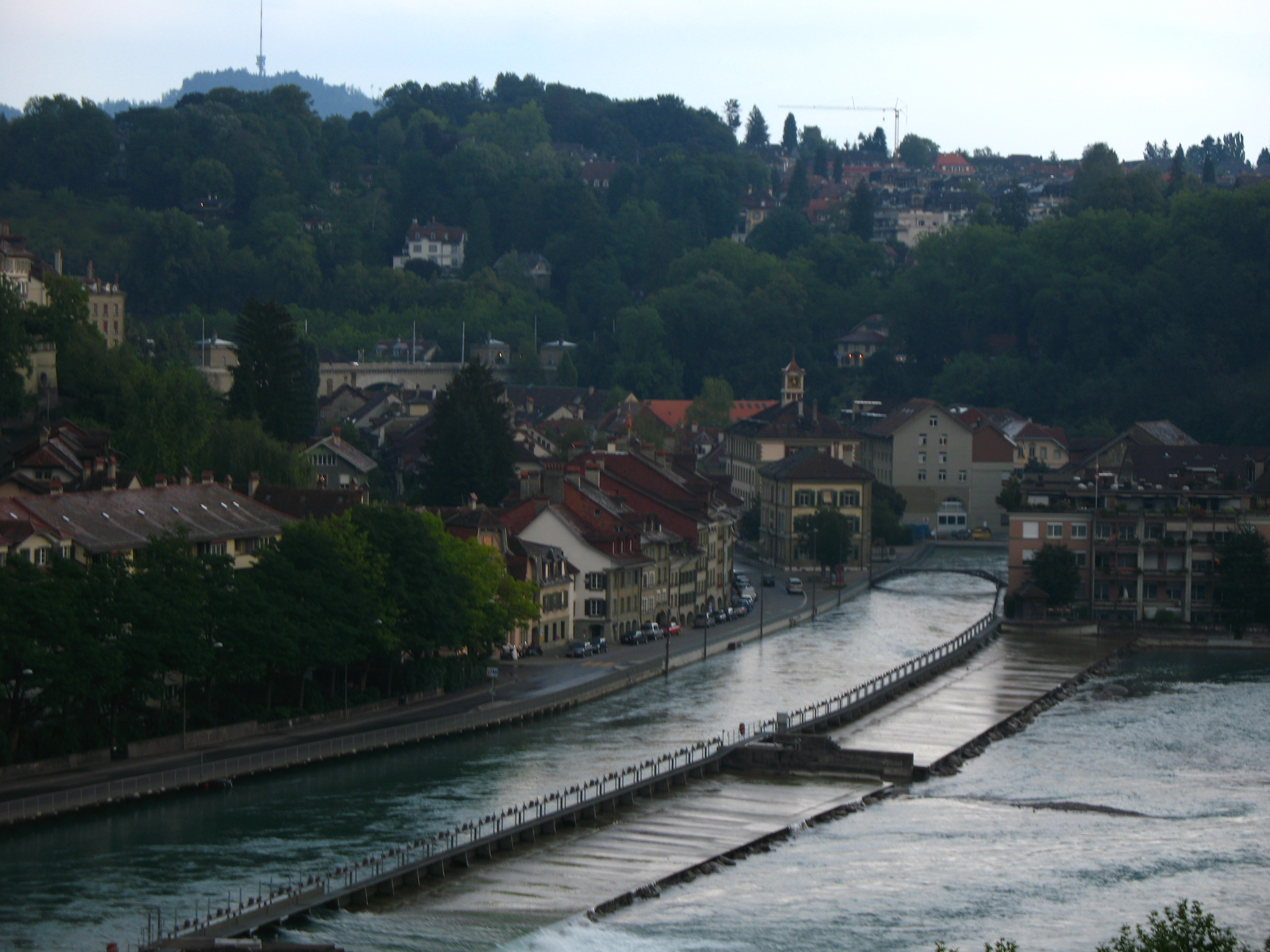
View from Church Span Bridge, Bern, Switzerland

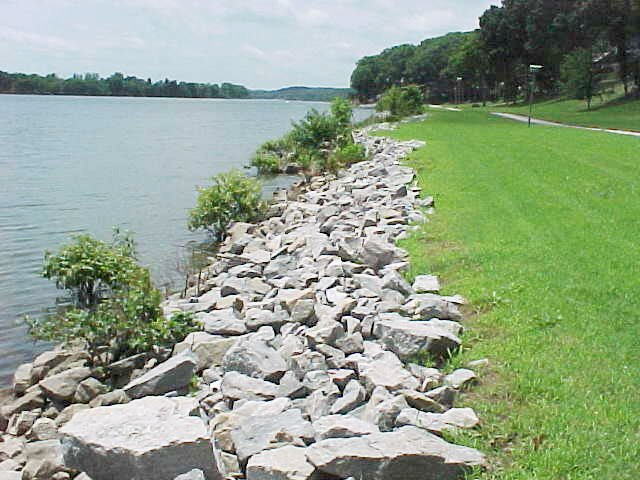
Riprap lining a lake shore

Hydraulic engineering as a sub-discipline of civil engineering is concerned with the flow and conveyance of fluids, principally water and sewage. One feature of these systems is the extensive use of gravity as the motive force to cause the movement of the fluids. This area of civil engineering is intimately related to the design of bridges, dams, channels, canals, and levees, and to both sanitary and environmental engineering.

Hydraulic engineering is the application of the principles of fluid mechanics to problems dealing with the collection, storage, control, transport, regulation, measurement, and use of water. Before beginning a hydraulic engineering project, one must figure out how much water is involved. The hydraulic engineer is concerned with the transport of sediment by the river, the interaction of the water with its alluvial boundary, and the occurrence of scour and deposition. "The hydraulic engineer actually develops conceptual designs for the various features which interact with water such as spillways and outlet works for dams, culverts for highways, canals and related structures for irrigation projects, and cooling-water facilities for thermal power plants."

== Fundamental principles ==
A few examples of the fundamental principles of hydraulic engineering include fluid mechanics, fluid flow, behavior of real fluids, hydrology, pipelines, open channel hydraulics, mechanics of sediment transport, physical modeling, hydraulic machines, and drainage hydraulics.

=== Fluid mechanics ===
Fundamentals of Hydraulic Engineering defines hydrostatics as the study of fluids at rest. In a fluid at rest, there exists a force, known as pressure, that acts upon the fluid's surroundings. This pressure, measured in N/m^{2}, is not constant throughout the body of fluid. Pressure, p, in a given body of fluid, increases with an increase in depth. Where the upward force on a body acts on the base and can be found by the equation:

$$p=\rho gy$$

where,

ρ = density of water
g = specific gravity
y = depth of the body of liquid

Rearranging this equation gives you the pressure head $\frac{p}{\rho g}=y$. Four basic devices for pressure measurement are a piezometer, manometer, differential manometer, Bourdon gauge, as well as an inclined manometer.

As Prasuhn states:

On undisturbed submerged bodies, pressure acts along all surfaces of a body in a liquid, causing equal perpendicular forces in the body to act against the pressure of the liquid. This reaction is known as equilibrium. More advanced applications of pressure are that on plane surfaces, curved surfaces, dams, and quadrant gates, just to name a few.

=== Behavior of real fluids ===
==== Real and Ideal fluids ====
The main difference between an ideal fluid and a real fluid is that for ideal flow p_{1} = p_{2} and for real flow p_{1} > p_{2}. Ideal fluid is incompressible and has no viscosity. Real fluid has viscosity. Ideal fluid is only an imaginary fluid as all fluids that exist have some viscosity.

==== Viscous flow ====
A viscous fluid will deform continuously under a shear force by the pascles law, whereas an ideal fluid does not deform.

==== Laminar flow and turbulence ====
The various effects of disturbance on a viscous flow are a stable, transition and unstable.

==== Bernoulli's equation ====
For an ideal fluid, Bernoulli's equation holds along streamlines.

$$\frac{p}{\rho g}+\frac{u^2}{2g}= \frac{p_1}{\rho g}+\frac{u_1^2}{2g} = \frac{p_2}{\rho g}+\frac{u_2^2}{2g}$$

As the flow comes into contact with the plate, the layer of fluid actually "adheres" to a solid surface. There is then a considerable shearing action between the layer of fluid on the plate surface and the second layer of fluid. The second layer is therefore forced to decelerate (though it is not quite brought to rest), creating a shearing action with the third layer of fluid, and so on. As the fluid passes further along with the plate, the zone in which shearing action occurs tends to spread further outwards. This zone is known as the "boundary layer". The flow outside the boundary layer is free of shear and viscous-related forces so it is assumed to act as an ideal fluid. The intermolecular cohesive forces in a fluid are not great enough to hold fluid together. Hence a fluid will flow under the action of the slightest stress and flow will continue as long as the stress is present. The flow inside the layer can be either vicious or turbulent, depending on Reynolds number.

== Applications ==
Common topics of design for hydraulic engineers include hydraulic structures such as dams, levees, water distribution networks including both domestic and fire water supply, distribution and automatic sprinkler systems, water collection networks, sewage collection networks, storm water management, sediment transport, and various other topics related to transportation engineering and geotechnical engineering. Equations developed from the principles of fluid dynamics and fluid mechanics are widely utilized by other engineering disciplines such as mechanical, aeronautical and even traffic engineers.

Related branches include hydrology and rheology while related applications include hydraulic modeling, flood mapping, catchment flood management plans, shoreline management plans, estuarine strategies, coastal protection, and flood alleviation.

== History ==
=== Antiquity ===
Earliest uses of hydraulic engineering were to irrigate crops and dates back to the Middle East and Africa. Controlling the movement and supply of water for growing food has been used for many thousands of years. One of the earliest hydraulic machines, the water clock was used in the early 2nd millennium BC. Other early examples of using gravity to move water include the Qanat system in ancient Persia and the very similar Turpan water system in ancient China as well as irrigation canals in Peru.

In ancient China, hydraulic engineering was highly developed, and engineers constructed massive canals with levees and dams to channel the flow of water for irrigation, as well as locks to allow ships to pass through. Sunshu Ao is considered the first Chinese hydraulic engineer. Another important Hydraulic Engineer in China, Ximen Bao was credited of starting the practice of large scale canal irrigation during the Warring States period (481–221 BC), even today hydraulic engineers remain a respectable position in China.

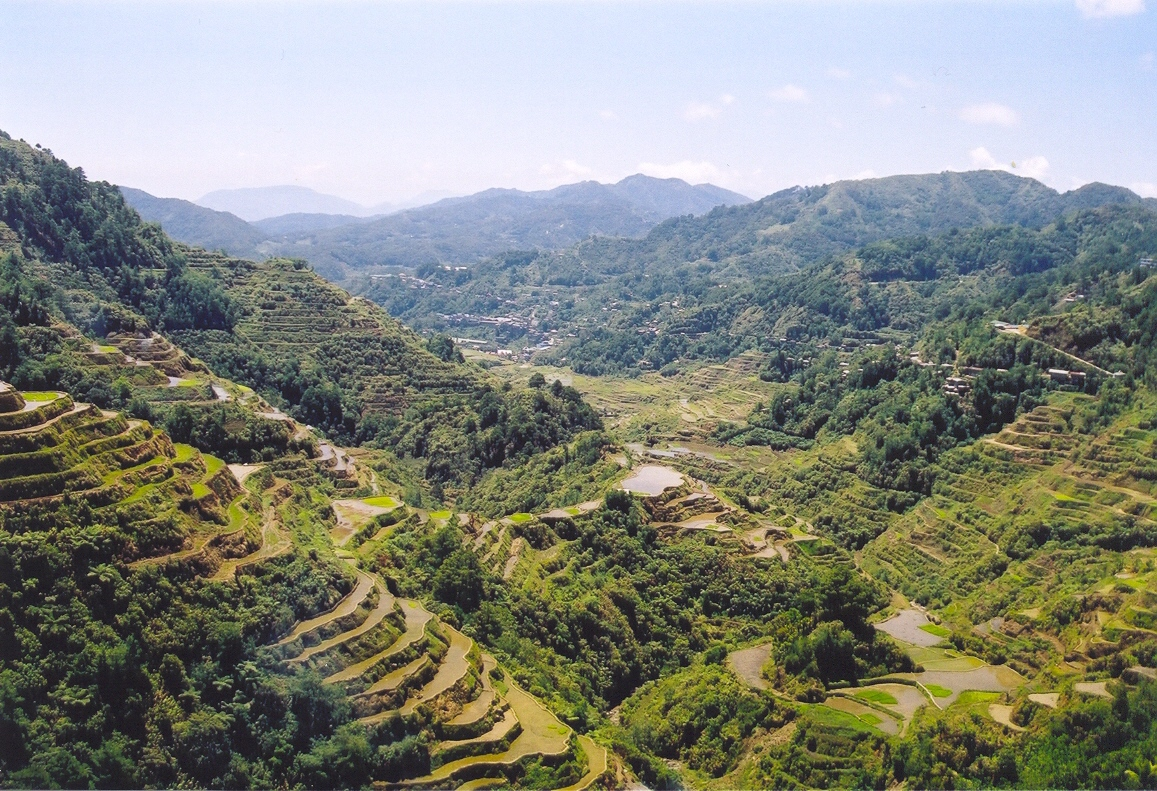
The Banaue Rice Terraces in the Philippine Cordilleras, ancient sprawling man-made structures which are a UNESCO World Heritage Site

In the Archaic epoch of the Philippines, hydraulic engineering also developed specially in the Island of Luzon, the Ifugaos of the mountainous region of the Cordilleras built irrigations, dams and hydraulic works and the famous Banaue Rice Terraces as a way for assisting in growing crops around 1000 BC. These Rice Terraces are 2,000-year-old terraces that were carved into the mountains of Ifugao in the Philippines by ancestors of the indigenous people. The Rice Terraces are commonly referred to as the "Eighth Wonder of the World". It is commonly thought that the terraces were built with minimal equipment, largely by hand. The terraces are located approximately 1500 metres (5000 ft) above sea level. They are fed by an ancient irrigation system from the rainforests above the terraces. It is said that if the steps were put end to end, it would encircle half the globe.

Eupalinos of Megara was an ancient Greek engineer who built the Tunnel of Eupalinos on Samos in the 6th century BC, an important feat of both civil and hydraulic engineering. The civil engineering aspect of this tunnel was that it was dug from both ends which required the diggers to maintain an accurate path so that the two tunnels met and that the entire effort maintained a sufficient slope to allow the water to flow.

Hydraulic engineering was highly emphasized in the Inca empire, they had the ability to manipulate water. In Típon the creation of terraces, water was able to reach different sections reaching elite residence and continues to be distributed in lower levels towards the agriculture, being able to maintain a whole community through the terraces.

Hydraulic engineering was highly developed in Europe under the aegis of the Roman Empire where it was especially applied to the construction and maintenance of aqueducts to supply water to and remove sewage from their cities. In addition to supplying the needs of their citizens they used hydraulic mining methods to prospect and extract alluvial gold deposits in a technique known as hushing, and applied the methods to other ores such as those of tin and lead.

In the 15th century, the Somali Ajuran Empire was the only hydraulic empire in Africa. As a hydraulic empire, the Ajuran State monopolized the water resources of the Jubba and Shebelle Rivers. Through hydraulic engineering, it also constructed many of the limestone wells and cisterns of the state that are still operative and in use today. The rulers developed new systems for agriculture and taxation, which continued to be used in parts of the Horn of Africa as late as the 19th century.

Further advances in hydraulic engineering occurred in the Muslim world between the 8th and 16th centuries, during what is known as the Islamic Golden Age. Of particular importance was the 'water management technological complex' which was central to the Islamic Green Revolution. The various components of this 'toolkit' were developed in different parts of the Afro-Eurasian landmass, both within and beyond the Islamic world. However, it was in the medieval Islamic lands where the technological complex was assembled and standardized, and subsequently diffused to the rest of the Old World. Under the rule of a single Islamic caliphate, different regional hydraulic technologies were assembled into "an identifiable water management technological complex that was to have a global impact." The various components of this complex included canals, dams, the qanat system from Persia, regional water-lifting devices such as the noria, shaduf and screwpump from Egypt, and the windmill from Islamic Afghanistan. Other original Islamic developments included the saqiya with a flywheel effect from Islamic Spain, the reciprocating suction pump and crankshaft-connecting rod mechanism from Iraq, and the geared and hydropowered water supply system from Syria.

=== Modern times ===
In many respects, the fundamentals of hydraulic engineering have not changed since ancient times. Liquids are still moved for the most part by gravity through systems of canals and aqueducts, though the supply reservoirs may now be filled using pumps. The need for water has steadily increased from ancient times and the role of the hydraulic engineer is a critical one in supplying it. For example, without the efforts of people like William Mulholland the Los Angeles area would not have been able to grow as it has because it simply does not have enough local water to support its population. The same is true for many of our world's largest cities. In much the same way, the central valley of California could not have become such an important agricultural region without effective water management and distribution for irrigation. In a somewhat parallel way to what happened in California, the creation of the Tennessee Valley Authority (TVA) brought work and prosperity to the South by building dams to generate cheap electricity and control flooding in the region, making rivers navigable and generally modernizing life in the region.

Leonardo da Vinci (1452–1519) performed experiments, investigated and speculated on waves and jets, eddies and streamlining. Isaac Newton (1642–1727) by formulating the laws of motion and his law of viscosity, in addition to developing the calculus, paved the way for many great developments in fluid mechanics. Using Newton's laws of motion, numerous 18th-century mathematicians solved many frictionless (zero-viscosity) flow problems. However, most flows are dominated by viscous effects, so engineers of the 17th and 18th centuries found the inviscid flow solutions unsuitable, and by experimentation they developed empirical equations, thus establishing the science of hydraulics.

Late in the 19th century, the importance of dimensionless numbers and their relationship to turbulence was recognized, and dimensional analysis was born. In 1904 Ludwig Prandtl published a key paper, proposing that the flow fields of low-viscosity fluids be divided into two zones, namely a thin, viscosity-dominated boundary layer near solid surfaces, and an effectively inviscid outer zone away from the boundaries. This concept explained many former paradoxes and enabled subsequent engineers to analyze far more complex flows. However, we still have no complete theory for the nature of turbulence, and so modern fluid mechanics continues to be a combination of experimental results and theory.

The modern hydraulic engineer uses the same kinds of computer-aided design (CAD) tools as many of the other engineering disciplines while also making use of technologies like computational fluid dynamics to perform the calculations to accurately predict flow characteristics, GPS mapping to assist in locating the best paths for installing a system and laser-based surveying tools to aid in the actual construction of a system.

== See also ==
- Civil engineering – Engineering discipline focused on physical infrastructure
- Eupalinos – Engineer in Ancient Greece
- HEC-RAS – Software for simulating water flow within rivers
- Henri Pitot – French hydraulic engineer (1695–1771)
- Hydrology – Science of the movement, distribution, and quality of water on Earth
- Hydrology (agriculture) – Study of agricultural water management, especially irrigation and drainage
- Hydraulic jack – Mechanical, hydraulic, or pneumatic, lifting device
- Hydraulic mining – Mining technique using high-pressure water jets to carve away minerals
- Hydraulic structure
- International Association for Hydro-Environment Engineering and Research
- Irrigation – Agricultural artificial application of water to land
- Significant modern floods – Water overflow submerging usually-dry land
- Naval engineering – Engineering discipline of marine vessels
- Sunshu Ao – Chinese hydraulic engineer and politician
- Ximen Bao – 4th-century BC Chinese philosopher and engineer
