= Geomori =

The Geomori (Ancient Greek: Γεωμόροι, 'land-sharers') were a group in a number of archaic Greek cities:

- Geomori (Athens), an obscure group in pre-Solonian Athens (7th century BC);
- Geomori (Samos), who ruled Samos in the early 6th century BC and possibly before;
- Geomori (Syracuse), who ruled Syracuse until c. 485 BC.
