= Heraion of Samos =

Ancient temple dedicated to Hera

- Ηραίο Σάμου (Greek)
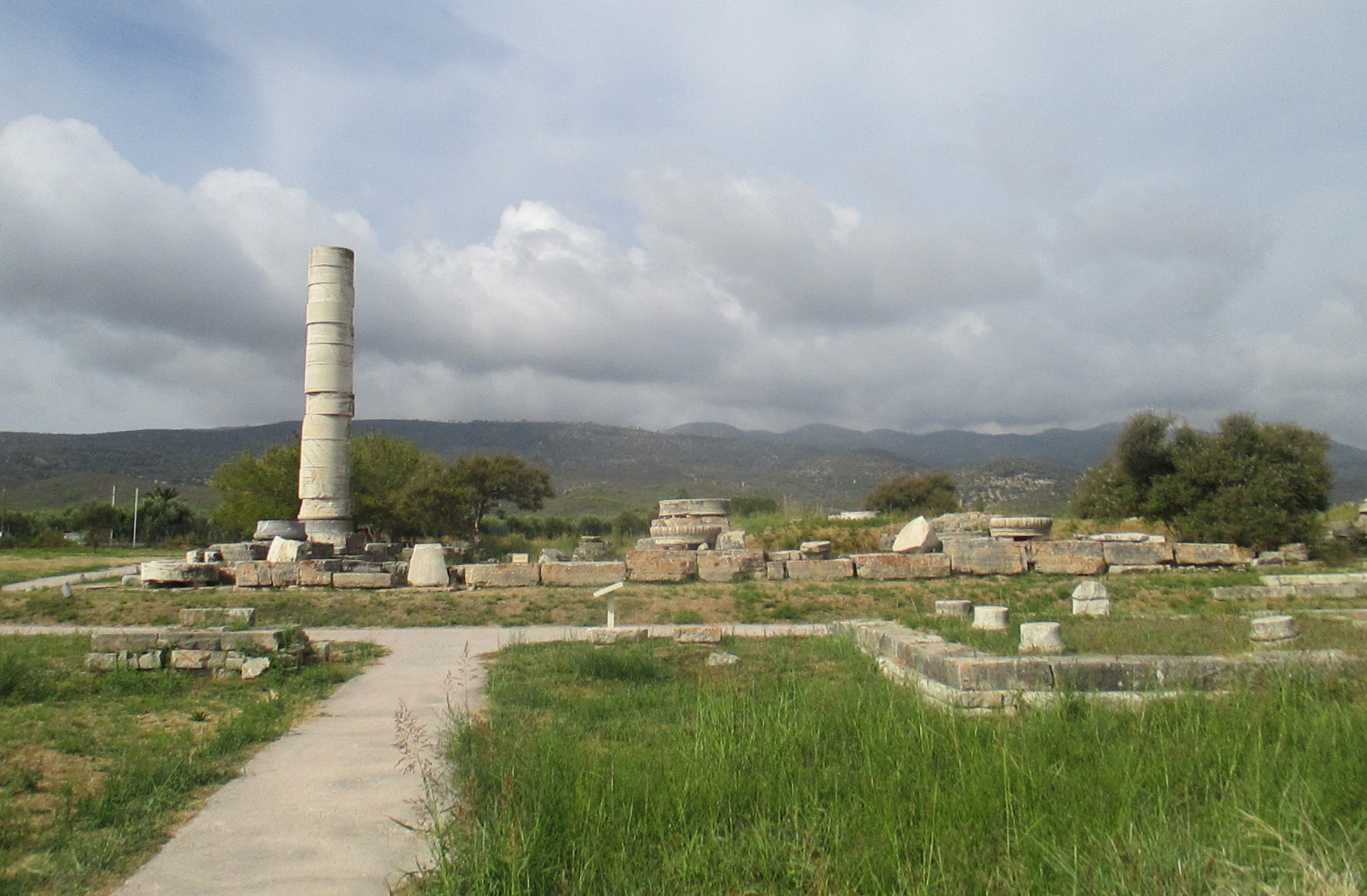
- Heraion in Samos, Greece.

- Location within Greece
- 37°40′19″N 26°53′08″E
- Type: Sanctuary
- Cultures: Ancient Greece
- Location: Samos, Greece

UNESCO World Heritage Site
- Official name: Pythagoreion and Heraion of Samos
- Type: Cultural
- Criteria: ii, iii
- Designated: 1992 (16th session)
- Reference no.: 595
- Region: Europe and North America

Site plan of the sanctuary. The numbers match the bold numerals in the text of the article

The Heraion of Samos was a large sanctuary to the goddess Hera, on the island of Samos, Greece, 6 km southwest of the ancient city of Samos (modern Pythagoreion). It was located in the low, marshy basin of the Imbrasos river, near where it enters the sea. The late Archaic temple in the sanctuary was the first of the gigantic free-standing Ionic temples, but its predecessors at this site reached back to the Geometric Period of the 8th century BC, or earlier, and there is evidence of cult activities on the site from c. 1700 BC onwards. The ruins of the temple, along with the nearby archeological site of Pythagoreion, were designated UNESCO World Heritage Sites in 1992, as a testimony to their exceptional architecture and to the mercantile and naval power of Samos during the Archaic Period.

== History ==
The core myth at the heart of the cult of Hera at Samos is that of her birth. According to the local tradition, the goddess was born under a lygos tree (Vitex agnus-castus, the "chaste-tree"). At the annual Samian festival called the Toneia, the "binding", the cult image of Hera was ceremonially bound with lygos branches, before being carried down to the sea to be washed. The tree still featured on the coinage of Samos in Roman times and Pausanias mentions that the tree still stood in the sanctuary.

Little information about the temple is preserved in literary sources. The most important source is Herodotus, who refers to the sanctuary's temple repeatedly, calling it "the largest of all the temples that we know of." He includes it among the three great engineering feats of Samos, along with the Tunnel of Eupalinos and the harbour mole at Pythagoreio. Otherwise, most of the sources are scattered references in works written long after the heyday of the sanctuary. Pausanias, whose Periegesis of Greece is our key source for most of the major sites of mainland Greece, did not visit Samos.

Archaeological evidence shows that the area was the site of a settlement in the Early Bronze Age and cult activity at the site of the altar may have begun in late Mycenaean period. The first temple of Hera was constructed in the eighth century BC. The peak period of prosperity in the sanctuary began in the late seventh century with the first phase of monumental building, which saw the construction of the Hekatompedos II temple, the south stoa, two colossal kouroi, and the Sacred Way, which linked the sanctuary to the city of Samos by land.

In the second quarter of the sixth century BC, there was a second even greater phase of monumentalisation, with construction of the monumental altar, the North and South Buildings, and the Rhoikos Temple. This was quickly followed by a third phase of monumentalisation which saw the North Building expanded and the beginning of work on a third, even larger temple to replace the Rhoikos Temple. This peak period coincides with the period when Samos was a major power in the Aegean, culminating in the reign of the tyrant Polycrates. In the Classical period, Samos came under Athenian domination and activity in the sanctuary almost completely ceases. A revival of activity took place in the Hellenistic period, which continued under the Roman Empire. Worship of Hera ceased in AD 391, when the Theodosian edicts forbade pagan observance. A Christian church was built on the site of in the fifth century AD and the site was used as a quarry throughout the Byzantine period.

== Description ==
Throughout the sanctuary's thousand-year history, its hub was the altar of Hera (7) and the successive temples opposite it, but it also contained several other temples, numerous treasuries, stoas, a sacred way, and countless honorific statues and other votive offerings.

=== Sacred Way ===
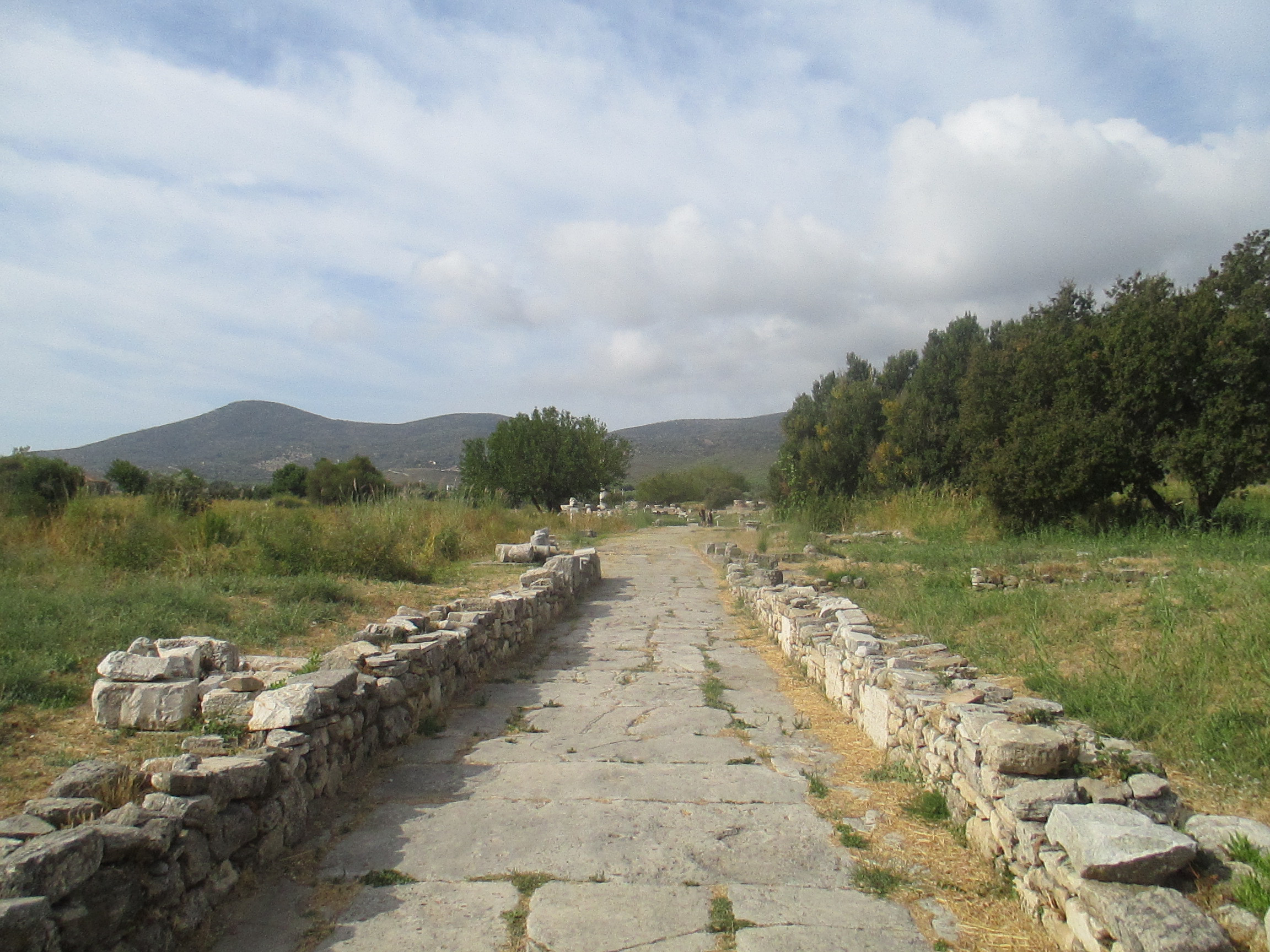
The Sacred Way

The Sacred Way was a road running from the city of Samos to the sanctuary, which was first laid out around 600 BC. Where the Sacred Way crossed the Imbrasos river, a large earthen dam was built to support the road and reroute the river. Previously, the sanctuary had been reached by sea and the main entrance was on the southeastern side, near the coast, but the construction of the Sacred Way led to a reorientation of the sanctuary, with the main entrance now being on the northern side of the temenos.

The Sacred Way played a central role in religious processions and its prominence is shown by the numerous votive offerings which lined its route and the fact that many of the sanctuary's structures share its alignment. It was repaved in the third century AD with the costly stone slabs which are visible today.

=== Temple of Hera ===
There were a succession of monumental temples built on roughly the same site to the west of the altar. From archaeological excavation many construction phases are known, identified in part through fragments of roof tiles.

==== First temple (Hekatompedos) ====
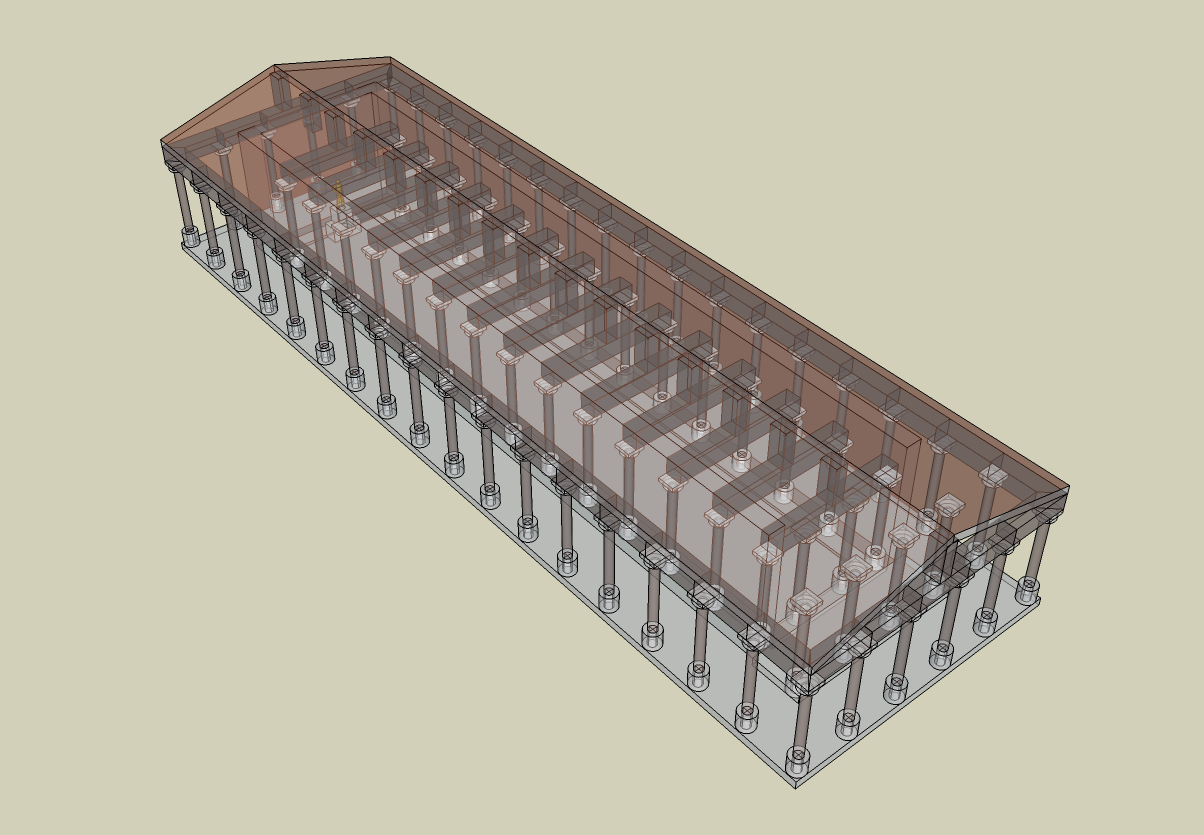
A reconstruction of the Hekatompedos (II) (isometric view)

The first temple, the Hekatompedos (I) (4) or hundred-foot temple marks the first monumental construction on the site, in the eighth century BC. This was a long, narrow building made of mudbrick, with a line of columns running down the centre to support the roof structure. It was rebuilt in the late seventh century, at the same time as the construction of the Sacred Way and the South Stoa. This second form is known as Hekatompedos (II) and was roughly 33 metres (108 ft) long. The walls were built of limestone rather than mudbrick; the east end was left open. There were two rows of interior columns along the side walls, meaning that there was a clear view along the central axis from the entrance to the cult statue. There may have been a colonnaded porch at the east end to mark the entranceway and a peripteral colonnade running around the outside, but this is not certain.

==== Second temple (Rhoikos temple) ====
A much larger temple was built by the architects Rhoikos and Theodoros and is known as the Rhoikos temple (2). It was about 100 metres (330 ft) long and 50 metres (160 ft) wide. At the front there was a deep roofed pronaos with a square floor plan, in front of a closed cella. Cella and pronaos were divided into three equal aisles by two rows of columns that marched down the pronaos and through the temple. A peripteral colonnade surrounded the temple, which was two rows deep (dipteral). There were twenty-one columns on each long side, ten columns along the back side, and eight along the front side. The columns stood on unusual torus bases that were horizontally fluted. The temple formed a unit with the monumental altar of Hera to the east, which shared its alignment and axis. Many columns were unfluted; perhaps this was left for a later date, as it was normally done after they were erected. No capitals survive from this temple, but some early Ionic order features are present.

For a long time, the date of this temple was disputed, but excavations in 1989 revealed that work began on it at some point between 600 and 570 BC, and was completed around 560 BC. It stood for only about a decade before it was destroyed around 550 BC, when it may have been toppled by an earthquake or dismantled because the marshy ground and poor foundations made it dangerously unstable. Much of its stone was reused in the construction of its successor, the Great temple.

The Rhoikos temple was the first of the massive Ionian temples, like the Temple of Artemis at Ephesus, which would be built in western Asia Minor and the Aegean during the Archaic and Classical periods. Helmut Kyrieleis observes that it "must have had central significance for the development of monumental Ionic architecture" for this reason.

==== Third temple (Polycrates temple) ====
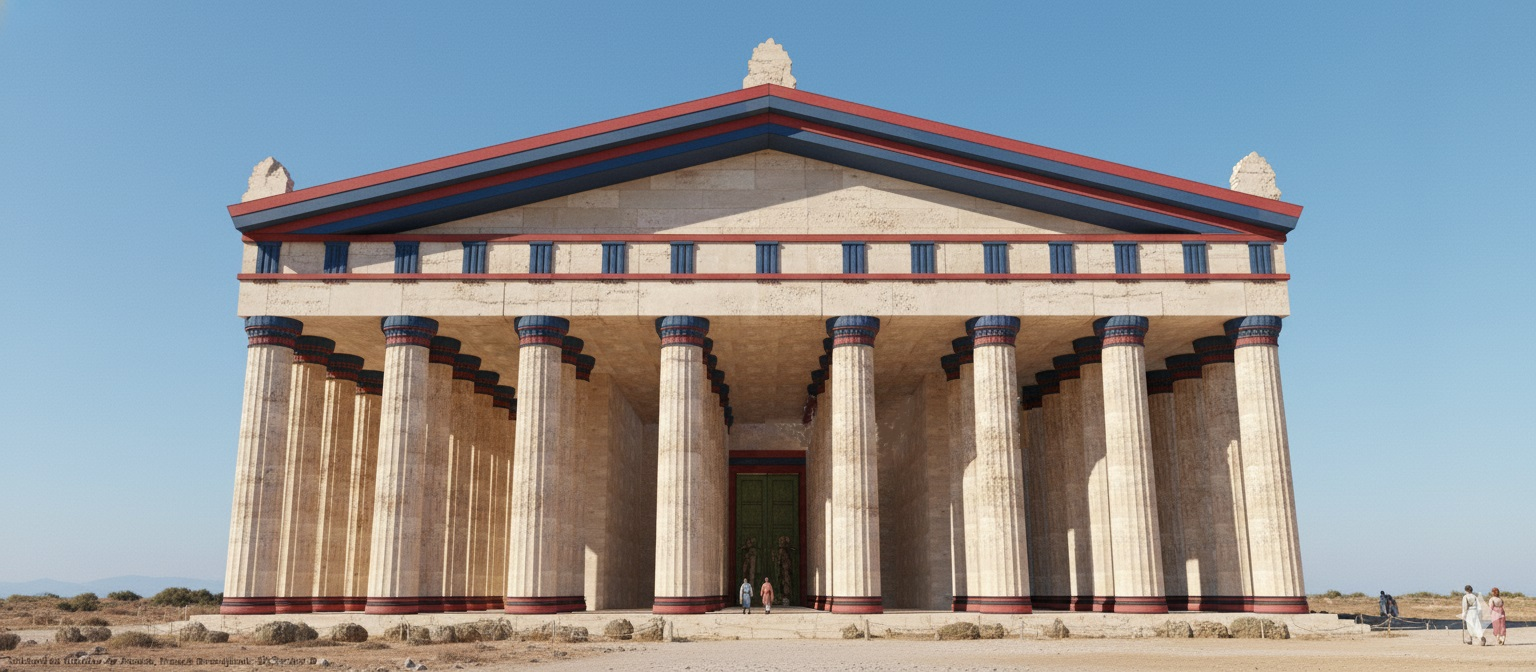
A reconstruction of the Great temple (front view)

After the destruction of the Rhoikos temple, an even larger one was built approximately 40 metres (130 ft) to the west, which is known as the "Great Temple" or the "Polycrates Temple" (1), after the famous tyrant of Samos who ruled around the time of its construction. This temple was 55.2 metres (181 ft) wide and 108.6 metres (356 ft), one of the largest floor plans of any Greek temple.

The first foundations of the cella were laid in the second half of the sixth century and are usually associated with the reign of Polycrates. The foundations of the peripteral colonnade and the pronaos were not laid until around 500 BC. Construction continued into the Roman period, but this temple was never wholly finished. The cult statue was eventually transferred to the Roman temple, though other statues and votives continued to be stored in it.

The geographer Strabo, who wrote at the beginning of the first century AD, describes the temple:

On the right as one sails to the city is the Posideion ... on the left is a suburb that is near the Heraion, and the Imbrasos River. The Heraion is an ancient sanctuary with a large temple and is now a picture gallery. Apart from the number of paintings placed there, there are other picture galleries and some shrines full of ancient art. It is open to the air and full of the best statues, of which there were three colossal works of Myron situated on a single base. Antonius took them away, but Sebastos Caesar put two back on the same base - the Athena and the Herakles - yet transferred the Zeus to the Capitolium, having erected a small shrine for it.

— Strabo, Geography 14. 1. 14

In Byzantine times, the temple served as a quarry, so that it was eventually dismantled to the very foundations, leaving only the foundations and a single column shaft, which seems to have been retained as a navigation point for ships.

==== Roman temple ====
At some point in the Roman period, a smaller Roman Temple (5) was built to house the cult image to the east of the Great temple, which remained under construction. In the fifth century AD, this temple was demolished and the stone was used to build a church on the site.

=== Altar ===
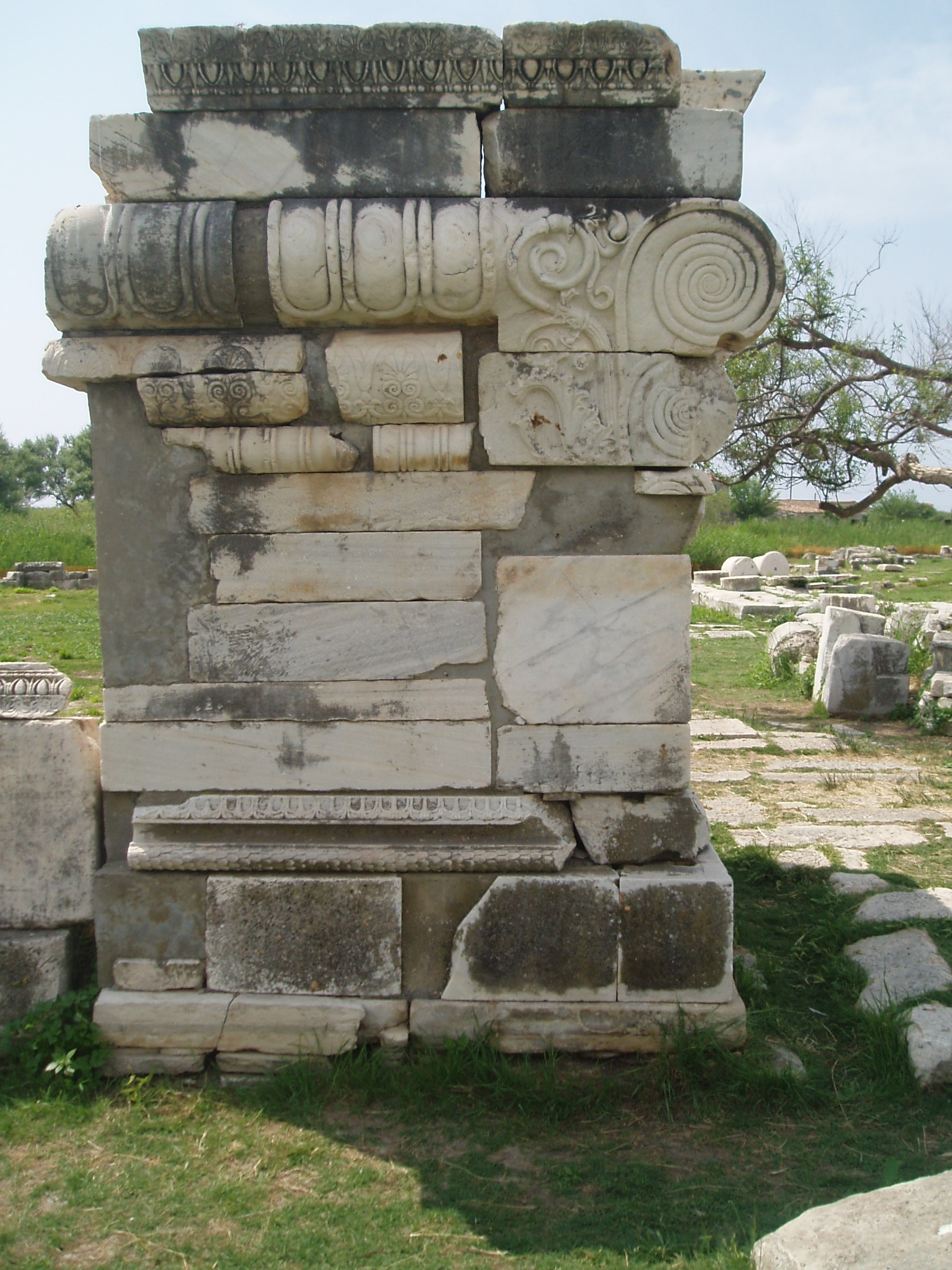
Spolia of the Great Altar

There is archaeological evidence of activity at the site of the altar (7) from the late Mycenaean period, but the first structure was built in the ninth century BC. This rough and undecorated stone structure measured 2.5 metres (8.2 ft) x 1.25 metres (4.1 ft).

It was rebuilt seven times, reaching its final monumental form in the sixth century at the same time as the construction of the Rhoikos temple, which was built on the same alignment and axis. The rectangular altar was roughly 35 metres (115 ft) long (north-south), 16 metres (52 ft) wide (east-west), and 20 metres (66 ft) high (up-down). The entire west side consisted of a staircase, leading up to a flat platform where sacrifices were performed, which was surrounded by a low wall on the north, east, and south sides. A series of floral and animal reliefs ran around the altar wall at the level of the platform and at the top of the low wall. The altar continued in use after the destruction of the Rhoikos temple, eventually receiving renovations in the Roman period.

The animal bones found on the site show that the majority of sacrifices were of fully grown cows. There were also quite a few sheep and pigs, as well as a few deer. No thigh bones were found on the site; Kyrieleis suggests that this may be because they were burnt on the altar or possibly because they were given to the priests as their special share.

There was a sacred grove to the east of the altar, which may have included the sacred lygos tree that was identified as the birthplace of Hera. It was previously believed that the stump of this tree had been recovered during the excavations in 1963, but subsequent testing proved that this was an unrelated juniper tree.

=== Stoas ===
The South stoa (11) was built at the end of the seventh century BC, as part of the same round of monumentalisation that saw the construction of the Hekatompedos temple and the Sacred Way. The South stoa was built of mudbrick and wood and measured about 60 metres (200 ft) in length, running roughly northwest–southeast. Two rows of columns supported the roof and interior walls divided it into three equal sections. The South stoa was demolished in the mid-sixth century BC, to make way for the South Building.

The North stoa (9) was built in the sixth century BC, perhaps to replace the South stoa, on roughly the same model and scale as the south stoa. It back wall was formed by a stretch of the sanctuary wall. Both stoas served to mark the edges of the sanctuary and provided a space for visitors to shelter from the sun and sleep at night.

=== North Building ===
The North Building (8) is located in the northern part of the sanctuary. It was first built in the mid-sixth century BC. At this point it was a 13.75 metres (45.1 ft) wide and 29 metres (95 ft) long cella, entered through a portico at the south end. A row of columns ran down the centre and the north end was separated off as an adyton. The structure was surrounded by a temenos wall. Between 530 and 500 BC, a peripteral colonnade was added to the structure, increasing its width to 25.8 metres (85 ft) and its length to 41.2 metres (135 ft). One of the roof tiles from the structure was inscribed ΠΟ (po), which Aideen Carty reads as an indication the Polycrates was personally responsible for the expansion of the structure.

The function of the structure remains unclear. Although the structure has the form of a temple, there does not appear to have been an altar associated with it. Kyrieleis suggests that it was built to serve as the treasury for the Samian state.

=== South Building ===
The South Building (10) was constructed in the mid-sixth century at the same time as, and on a similar design to, the North Building. The South stoa was demolished to make way for it.

=== Sculpture ===
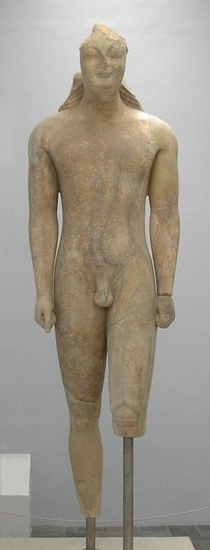
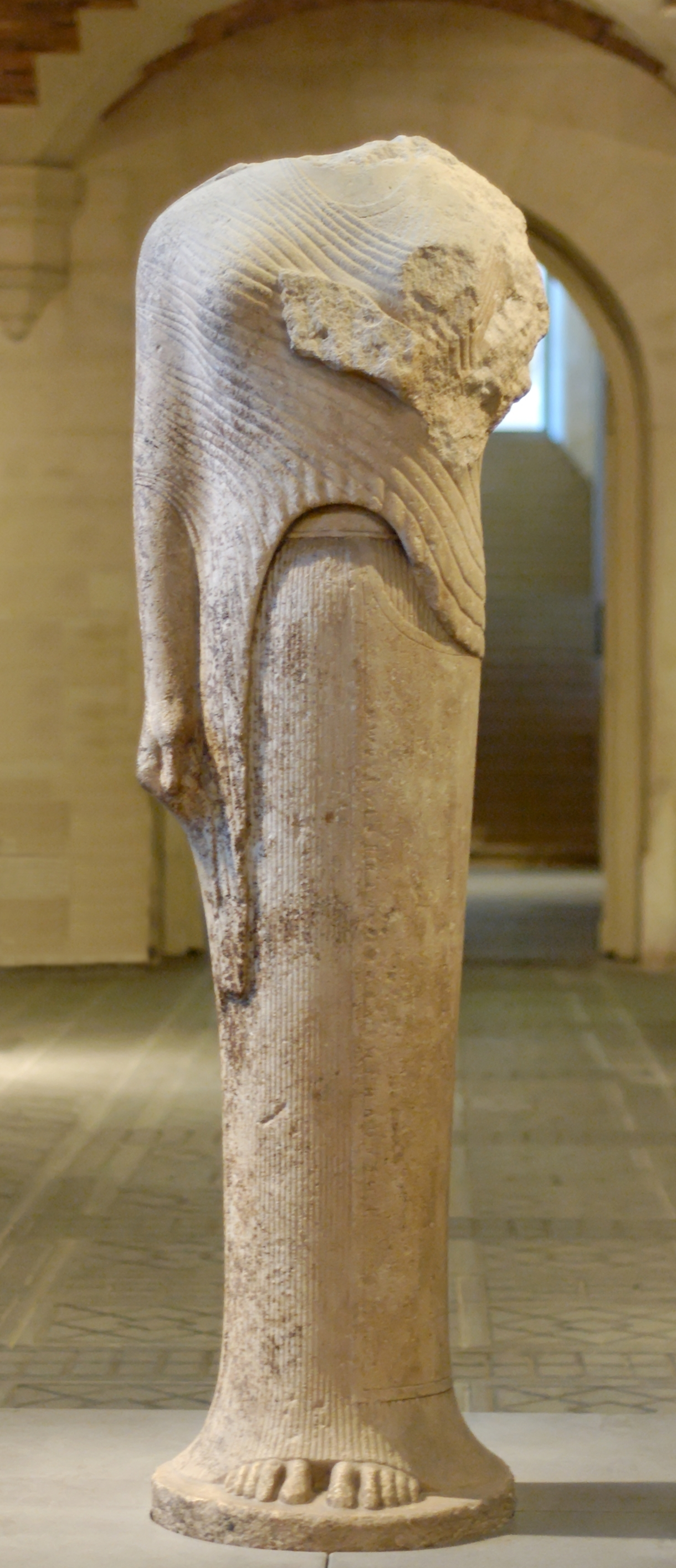
Kouros of Samos (left) and Hera of Samos (right)

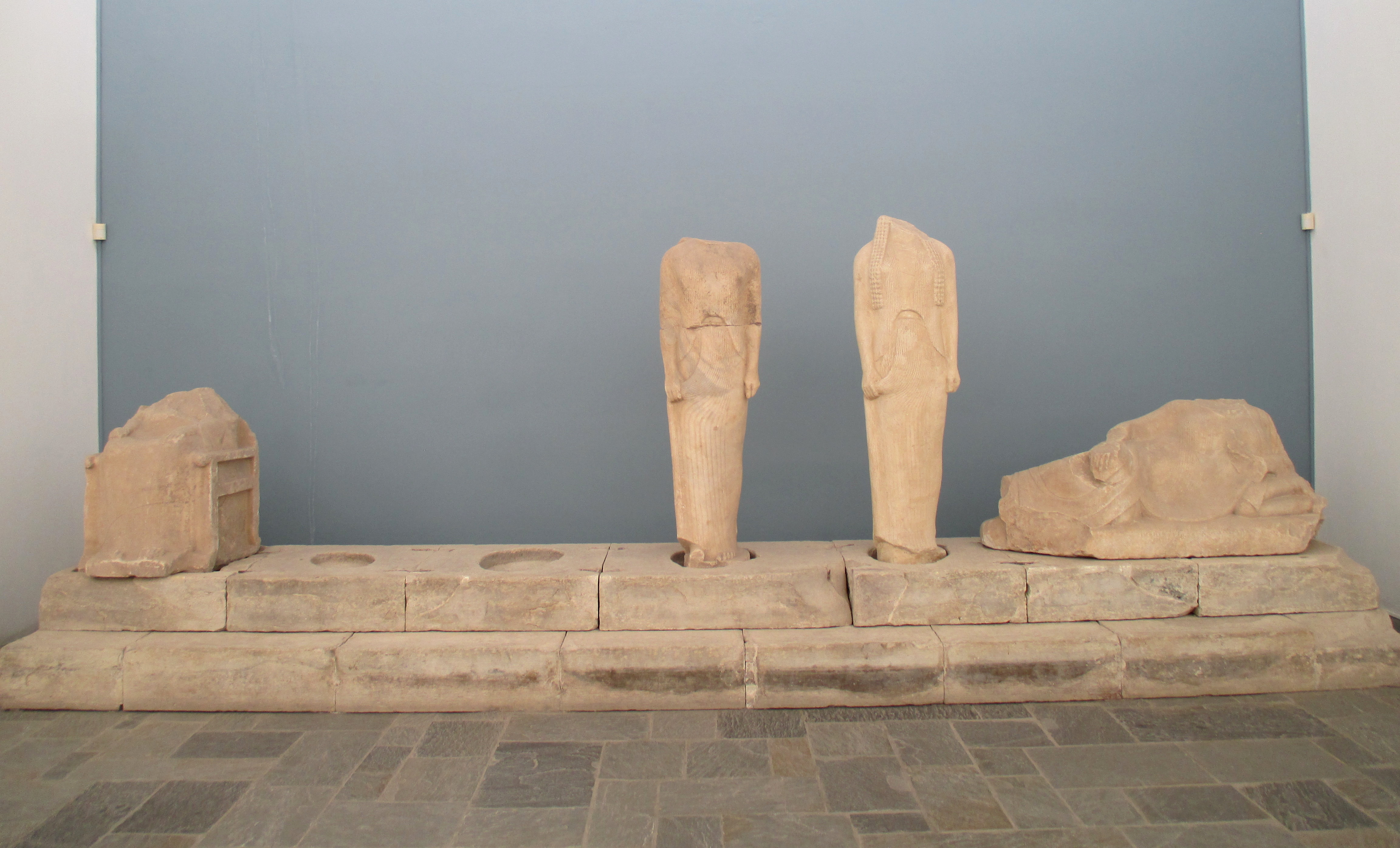
The Geneleos group

A large number of monumental statues and statuary groups were dedicated in the sanctuary, mainly in the sixth century BC. Most of these are kouroi, which are over-life-size statues of naked young men, or korai, which are statues of young women on a similar scale but clothed and veiled. These dedications seem to be the work of individual Samian aristocrats, who erected them in order to demonstrate their wealth and status - one of the ways in which the sanctuary was used by them as a venue for status competition.

A spectacular early sixth-century kouros, known as the Kouros of Samos was found under Roman-period pavement of the Sacred Way at the north end of the sanctuary, where it originally stood near the entrance to the sanctuary area. At about three times life size, it is among the largest known kouroi and would have dominated the whole sanctuary at the time of its erection, around 580 BC. An inscription on the thigh states that it was dedicated by one Isches son of Rhesus, presumably an important aristocrat. It is the earliest known example of monumental East Ionian sculpture. It is now displayed in the Samos Archaeological Museum. This and other finds demonstrate the important role played by workshops on Samos in the development of Greek sculpture. A similar kouros was located next to the Hekatompedos II temple; it was destroyed in the mid-sixth century and survives only in fragments.

An aristocrat called Cheramyes dedicated a group consisting of a kouros and three korai around 560 BC. One of the korai is now located in the Louvre, where it is known as the Hera of Samos. This sculpture is no longer thought to depict Hera, but may rather be a depiction of a priestess (perhaps related to Cheramyes himself). Another group consisted of six figures built into a single base on the Sacred Way and is known as the Geneleos group, after the sculptor who carved it. The individual sculptures depict the members of the dedicator's family. The seated figure of the mother sat at the left end of the base, with an inscription giving her name, Phileia, and that of the sculptor, Geneleos. Her head is lost. The father was depicted at the right end, reclining as if for the symposium. An inscription on the sculpture once identified him, but the section that gave his actual name is lost, as are his head and feet. In between the mother and father were standing figures of a son and three daughters. Two of the daughters survive but their heads are lost; inscriptions identify them as Philippe and Ornithe.

=== Votive offerings ===
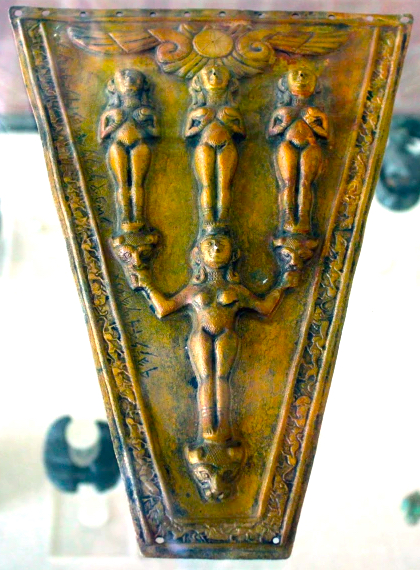
The "Hazael horse frontlet", from ancient Syria in the Archaeological Museum of Vathi on Samos

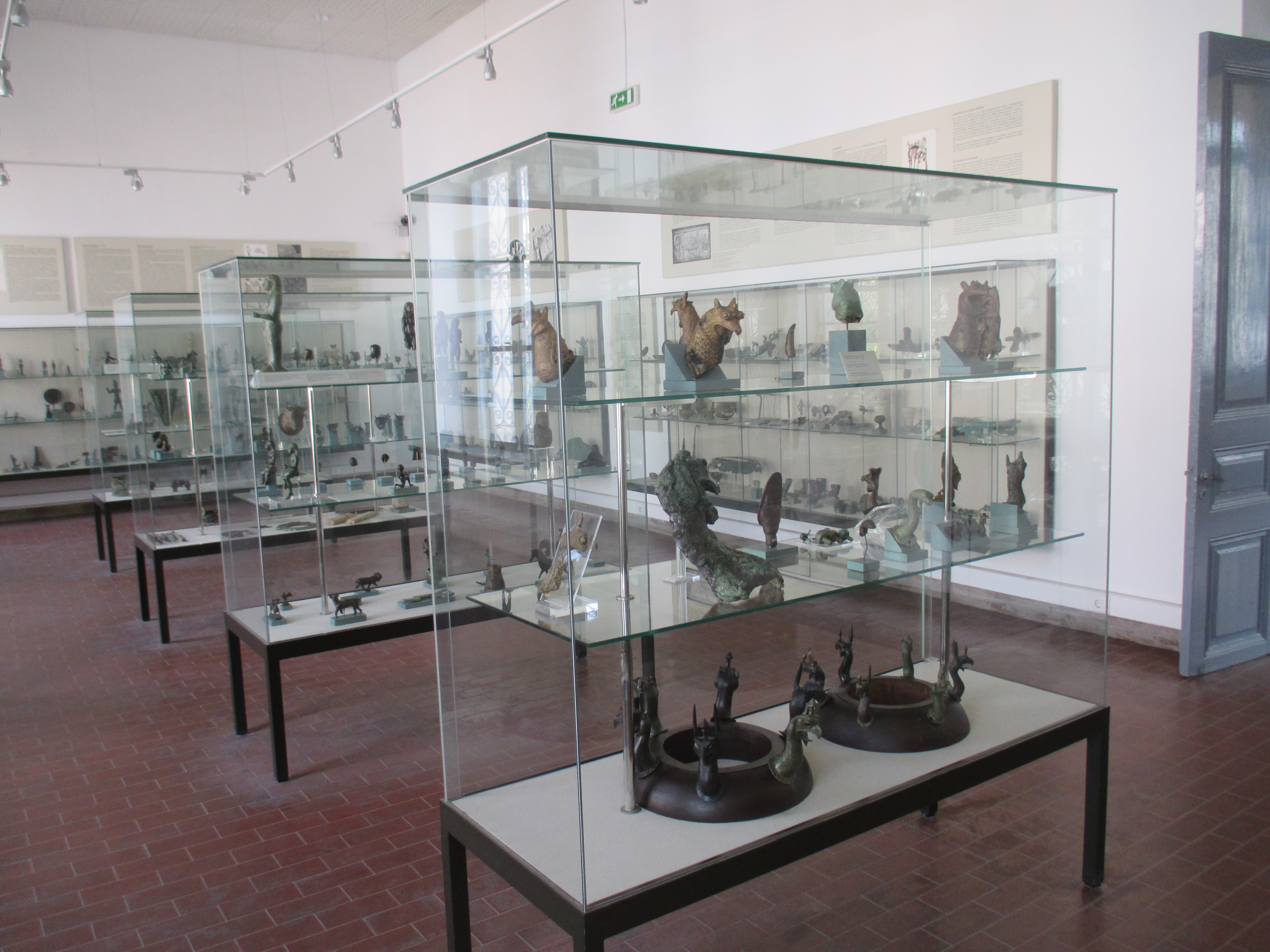

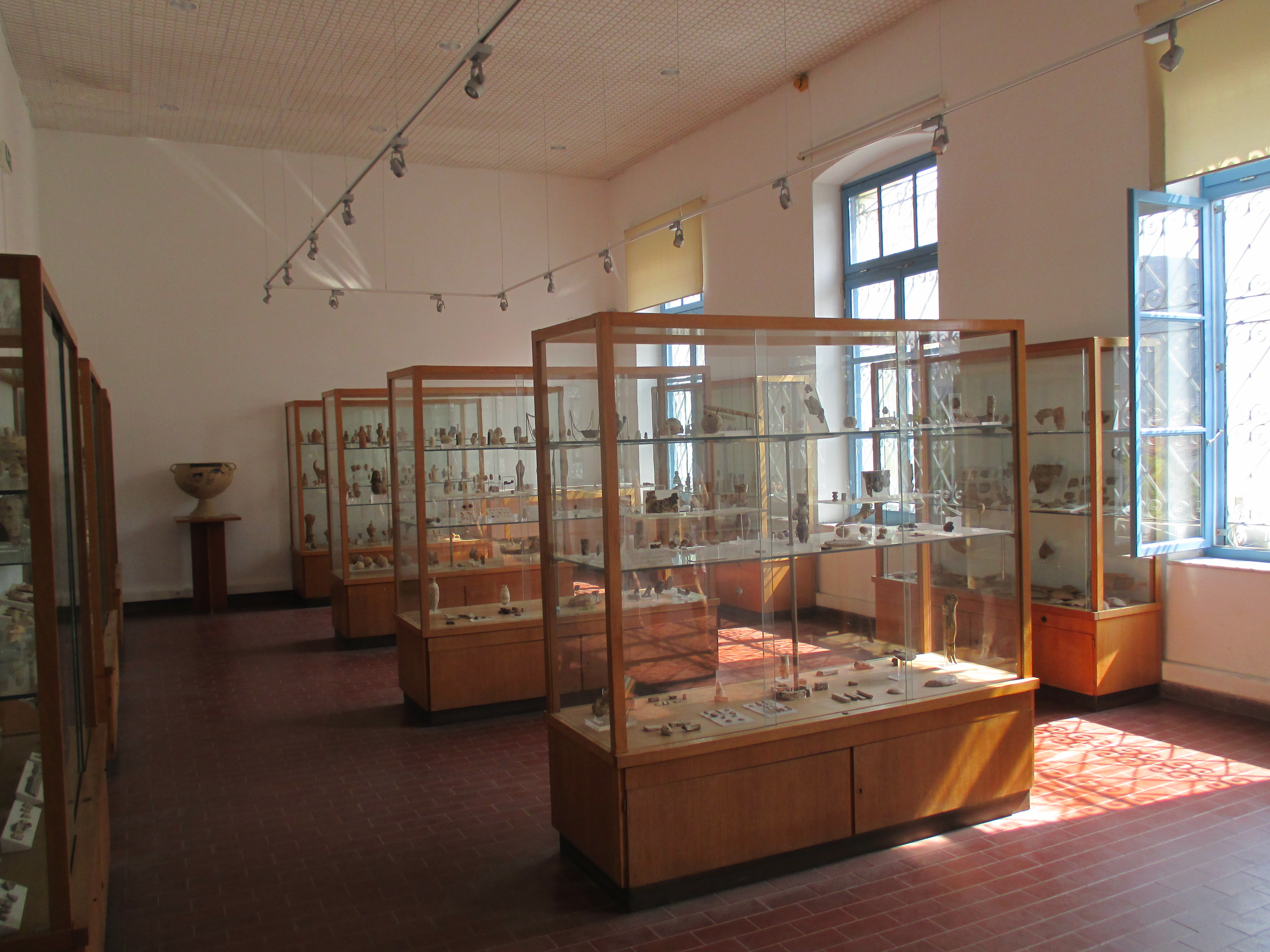

A large number of terracotta and ivory pomegranates and poppy pods have been found near the temple - representations of votive offerings of perishable goods in a more permanent medium. Archaeobotanical analysis has revealed large quantities of pomegranate and poppy seeds on the site, which demonstrate that the real fruit were indeed presented to the goddess as offerings.

Substantial amounts of pottery tableware and drinking cups were found around the sanctuary, where they were used in sacrificial feasts. The most significant are a type from the early sixth century. Some of these are painted with ΗΡΗ (Hera), indicating that they belonged to the goddess. Others have the letters ΔΗ (DE) painted on them, which might indicate that they were public property (demosion). Either interpretation would be important for understanding the political history of early sixth century Samos, which is very obscure. However, Kyrieleis has argued that they actually read (Η)ΡΗ (Hera). The workshops in which this pottery was manufactured have been found on the site of the sanctuary.

The waterlogged soil has preserved a large number of wooden votives from the Archaic period. This is exceptional - almost no other wooden objects from this period have been found in Greece - and they thus provide a unique insight into the ritual activities of less wealthy visitors to the sanctuary. They include a wide range of pieces from masterpieces of wooden sculpture and furniture, through to roughly carved spoons. A particularly special class of object are roughly carved curved objects, of which about 40 examples have been found to date. These are usually around 40 centimetres (16 in) long and have been identified as rather abstract depictions of boats. They may be the dedications of shipowners or objects for a special ritual. A full-size ship's hull from the late seventh century BC, measuring about 20 metres (66 ft), was also found. There are also several miniature stools, intricately carved with images of horses.

A number of the votives dedicated in the late seventh and sixth centuries BC attest to the far-reaching commercial links of archaic Samos and the prestige attached to votive dedications of exotic objects at that time. These objects include natural treasures, such as skull fragments from an Egyptian crocodile and hartebeest, as well as a stalactite and lumps of rock crystal. They also include exotic manufactured items, chiefly ivories from Egypt and the Near East. Two bronze figurines of the goddess Gula from Isin in Babylonia might be early examples of interpretatio graeca. A bronze horse trapping, the Hazael horse frontlet, from northern Syria (possibly Arslan Tash) bears an Aramaic inscription from the late ninth century BC - the earliest example of alphabetic writing found anywhere in Greece. Other votives originated in Cyprus, Phoenicia, even Iran and Urartu. Some of these items were acquired through trade, especially the export of Greek slaves, while others may have been the proceeds of mercenary service. Aideen Carty interprets these votives as evidence of the important role of the sanctuary in aristocratic competitive display in the archaic period.

On a smaller scale the votive objects indicate that these two phenomena - interaction with the wider world and use of the sanctuary for competitive display - continued in later periods. The site is peppered with the remains of honorific decrees and statues from the Hellenistic-Roman period, of the type found throughout the Eastern Mediterranean in this period. Additionally, six to thirteen figurines of Isis nursing Horus have been found at the site, indicating that connection or association between Hera and Isis developed in the Hellenistic-Roman period.

== Excavation ==
The first Westerner to visit the site was Joseph Pitton de Tournefort, commissioned by Louis XIV to travel in the East and report his findings. Tournefort visited Samos in 1704, and published his drawings of the ruins as engravings. Massive siltation deposits obscured, yet protected the site from amateur tinkering in the 18th and 19th centuries. Reeds and blackberry canes provided daunting cover, and the water table, which has risen since Antiquity, discouraged trench-digging at the same time that it preserved wooden materials in anoxic strata.

Thus the first preliminary archaeological excavations did not take place until 1890–92, under the direction of Panagiotis Kavvadias and Themistoklis Sofoulis, on behalf of the Greek Archaeological Society of Athens. The full extent of the third temple's foundations were not revealed until Theodor Wiegand's campaign of 1910–14 on behalf of the Royal Museum of Berlin. Rubble demonstrated that there had been a previous temple.

In 1925 German archaeologists from the German Archaeological Institute at Athens, began a sustained campaign of excavations at the site; work that was interrupted by the Second World War commenced again in 1951. These excavations were led by Ernst Buschor until 1961, when he was succeeded by Ernst Homann-Wedeking. Helmut Kyrieleis and Hermann J. Kienast took charge of the excavations in 1976. The results of these excavations have been published in a series of volumes in German under the general title Samos, which were edited to a high standard. These excavations established a chronology against which the wide range of votive objects deposited at the Heraion from the 8th century onward can be compared.

== Bibliography ==
- Ohnesorg, Aenne (1990). "Archaic roof tiles from the Heraion on Samos". Hesperia. 59 (1): 181–192. doi:10.2307/148133. JSTOR 148133.
- Kyrieleis, H. (1993). "The Heraion at Samos". In Marinatos, N.; Hägg, R. (eds.). Greek Sanctuaries: New Approaches. pp. 125–153.
- Pedley, John (2005). Sanctuaries and the Sacred in the Ancient Greek World. Cambridge: Cambridge University Press. pp. 154-168. ISBN 9780521809351.
- Carty, Aideen (2005). Polycrates, Tyrant of Samos: New Light on Archaic Greece. Stuttgart: Franz Steiner Verlag.
