= Eupalinos =

Engineer in Ancient Greece

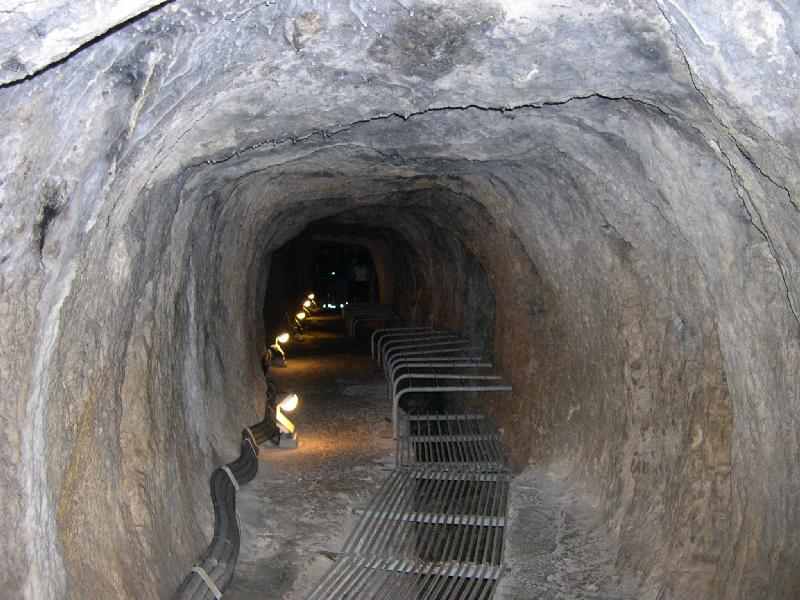
Tunnel of Eupalinos

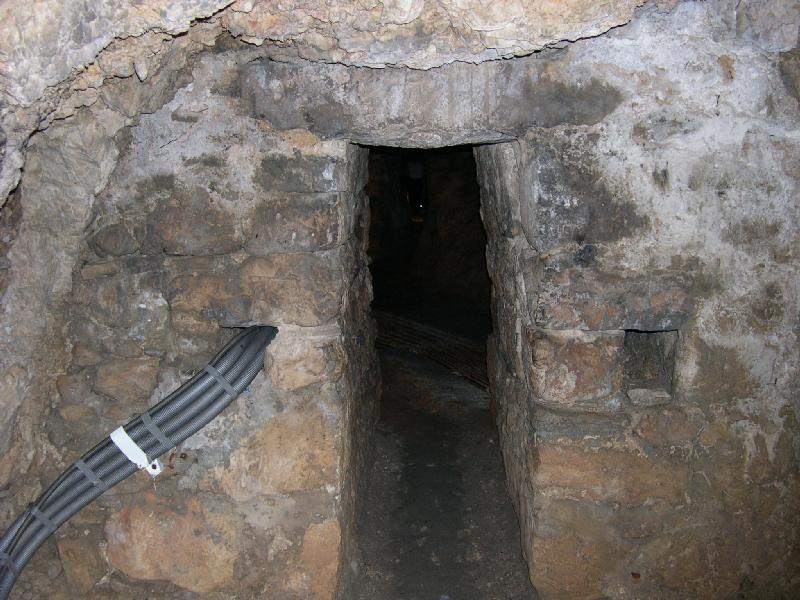
Entrance of tunnel

Eupalinos (Ancient Greek: Εὐπαλῖνος) or Eupalinus of Megara was an ancient Greek engineer who built the Tunnel of Eupalinos on Samos Island in the late 6th century BCE. Though the construction of the tunnel has been attributed to the tyrant Polycrates of Samos, it is now considered to be a later construction and having been built between 550 and 530 BCE. In any case, the tunnel was, and is, regarded as a major feat of engineering.

The tunnel 1,036 m (3,399 ft) long conveyed water from a spring near Mount Kastro through the mountain into the ancient city of Samos (modern Pythagoreio). It was the longest one of its time and it still exists. The tunnel was excavated from both ends, but it is not the first one known to be built in this manner -- a tunnel channeling water to Jerusalem was built from both ends at the same time earlier, in the 8th century BCE.

The route of the tunnel does not follow a direct line -- for several hundred meters on both ends, it does follow a straight line, but in the middle third, there are several turns. Additionally, the tunnel has two parts: A main tunnel and a trench running along the left side of the main tunnel. The main tunnel is 1.8 m × 1.8 m (5.9 ft × 5.9 ft) square in cross-section. And, while the main tunnel is horizontal, the trench gets progressively deeper with an average gradient of 0.4% and gets from 3.5 to 8.5 m (11 to 28 ft) deep. On the bottom of the trench ran a terracotta pipeline carrying the water.

Eupalinos is considered the first hydraulic engineer in history whose name has been passed down. Apart from that, though, nothing more is known about him.

Efpalinos Tunnel, a road tunnel built under the Geraneia mountains in Corinthia and completed in 2017, is named after Eupalinos.

Eupalinos's name features in the title of Paul Valéry’s work Eupalinos, or the Architect (in French: Eupalinos ou l’Architecte, published in 1921), which had a significant influence on French artists and architects (in particular, on Auguste Perret), but also on the theoretical basis of the "monumental order" and the Art Deco in general.

== See also ==
- Ancient Greek units of measurement
