= Pythagoreion =

Ancient fortified port in Samos, Greece

Pythagoreion of Samos
UNESCO World Heritage Site
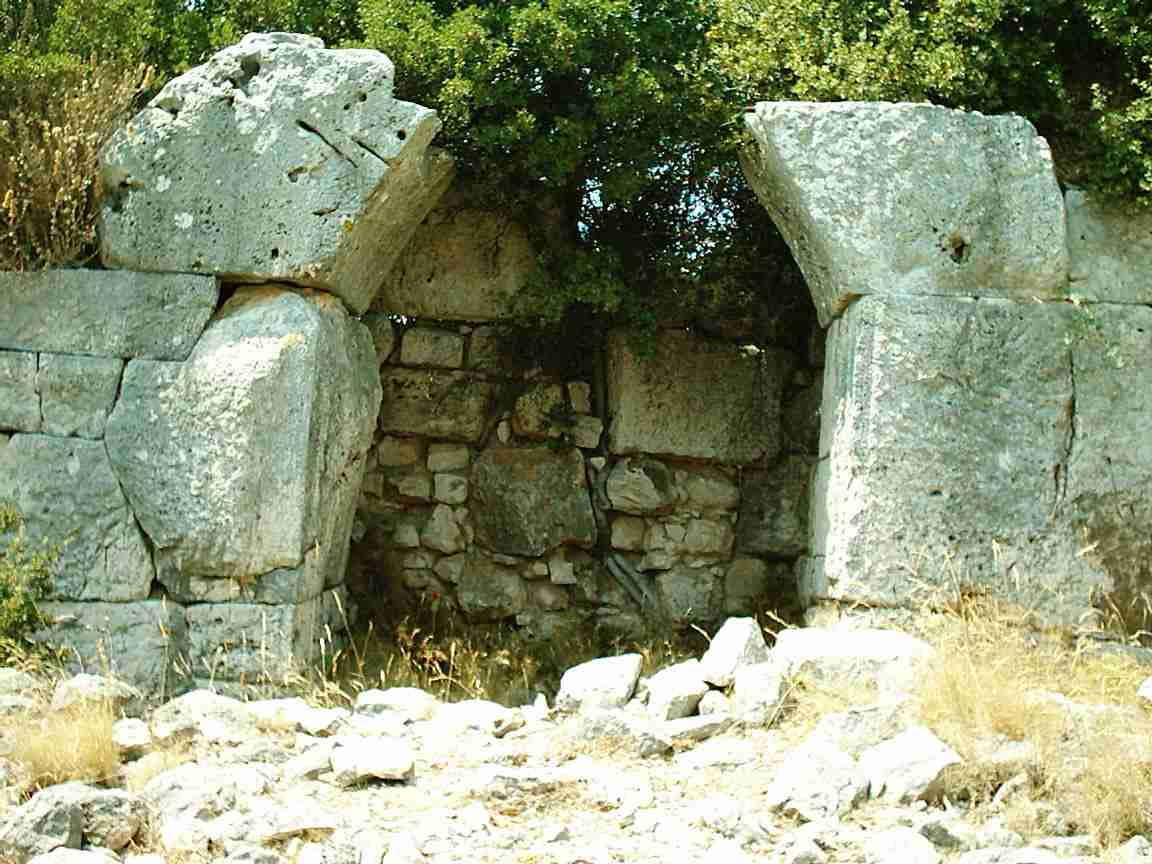
- Antique fortification walls in Pythagorio

- Location within Greece
- Location: Samos, Greece
- Part of: Pythagoreion and Heraion of Samos
- Criteria: Cultural: (ii)(iii)
- Reference: 595-001
- Inscription: 1992 (16th Session)
- Area: 285.9 ha (706 acres)
- Buffer zone: 402.25 ha (994.0 acres)
- Coordinates: 37°41′27″N 26°56′36″E

The Pythagoreion is the archaeological site of the ancient town of Samos in Samos, Greece. It is located in the area of the modern town of Pythagoreio, from which it got its modern name. The archaeological site contains ancient Greek and Roman monuments and a famous ancient tunnel, the Tunnel of Eupalinos or Eupalinian aqueduct. Along with the Heraion of Samos, the Pythagoreion was registered as a UNESCO World Heritage Site in 1992 because of its testimony to the cultural, military, and economic importance of Samos during Archaic and early Classical Greece.

== History ==
The oldest archeological finds at the site date to the 4th millennium BC, during the Neolithic Period. However, the settlement began around the 16th century BC, when the Minoans colonized Samos. After the Trojan War, the naval and economic importance of Samos grew until its zenith in the 6th century BC. Although it was conquered by the Persians shortly thereafter, the town remained an influential trading center until the 3rd century AD.

== Description ==
The ancient town is surrounded by fortifications which date back to the Classical Period during the 5th and 4th centuries BC. Excavations into the town itself have uncovered the street plan of the ancient city, including a sewage system and both public and religious buildings. In addition, the remains of Roman buildings can be found on the site, including an agora, public baths, a stadium, and town houses.

== Museum ==
A recently built museum is located in the modern city centre. It displays over 3000 objects that present the cultural evolution of the ancient city of Samos and its rural surroundings from the 4th millennium BC until the 7th century AD.
