= Pythagoreio =

Town in Samos, Greece

Pythagoreio Πυθαγόρειο
- Municipal unit
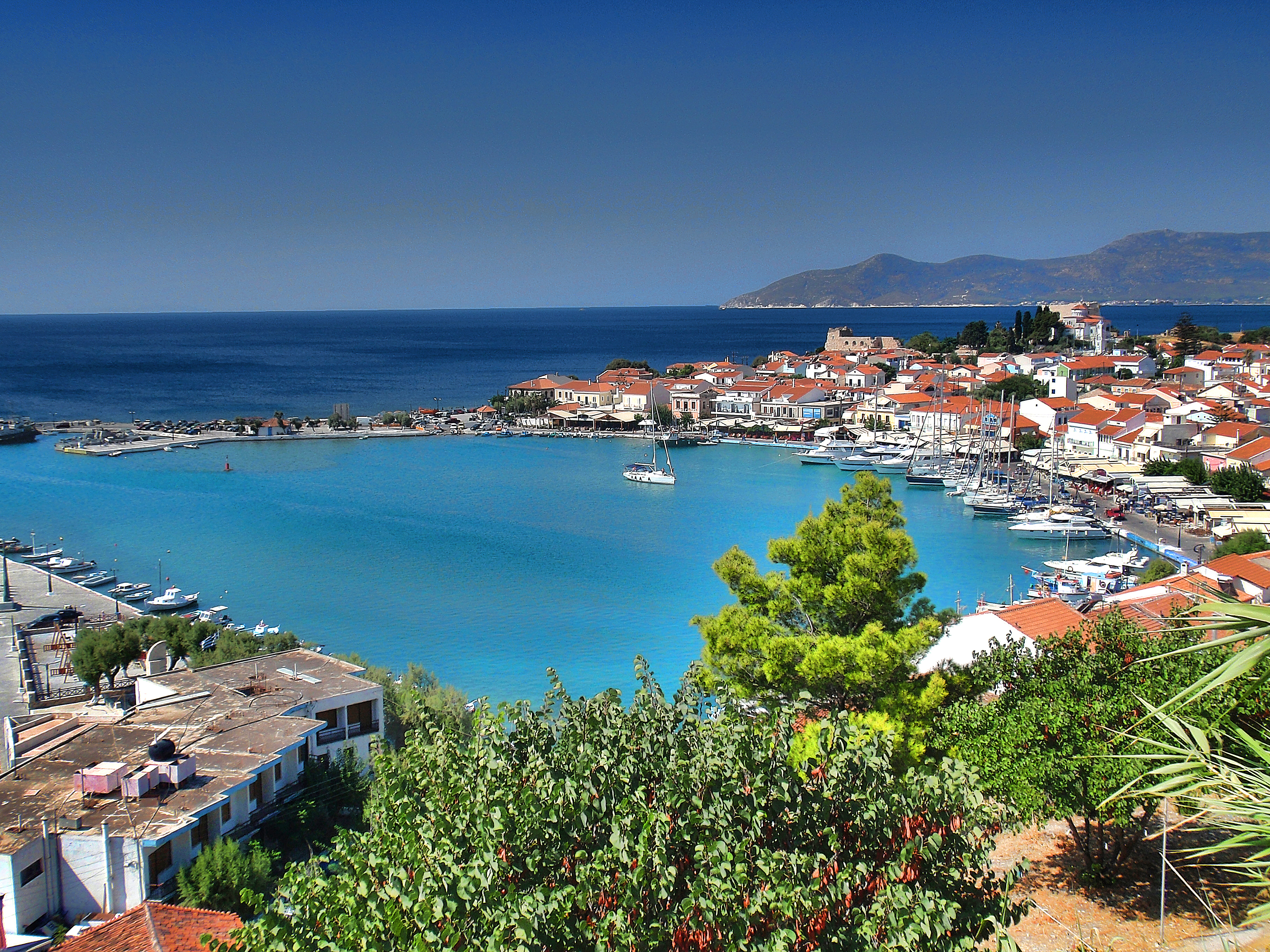
- Panorama of Pythagoreio.

- Location within the regional unit

- Location within Greece
- Coordinates: 37°42′N 26°57′E
- Country: Greece
- Administrative region: North Aegean
- Regional unit: Samos
- Municipality: East Samos

Area
  - Municipal unit: 164.7 km^{2} (63.6 sq mi)

Population (2021)
  - Municipal unit: 7,515
  - Municipal unit density: 45.63/km^{2} (118.2/sq mi)
  - Community: 1,538
- Time zone: UTC+2 (EET)
  - Summer (DST): UTC+3 (EEST)
- Vehicle registration: ΜΟ

Pythagoreio (Greek: Πυθαγόρειο) is a town and municipal unit on the island of Samos, North Aegean, Greece. Before the 2011 local government reform, Pythagoreio was a municipality. Since 2019, it is a municipal unit of East Samos. In 2021, the town's population was 7,515. It is the largest municipal unit in land area on Samos, at 164.662 km^{2} (63.576 sq mi). It shares the island with the municipal units of Vathy, Karlovasi, and Marathokampos. The archaeological remains in the town, known collectively as Pythagoreion, has designated a joint UNESCO World Heritage Site with nearby Heraion.

The seat of the municipality was the town of Pythagorio, formerly known as Tigani. The town was renamed in 1955 to honour the locally born mathematician and philosopher Pythagoras. The port of the town is considered to be the oldest man-made port of the Mediterranean Sea.

== History ==
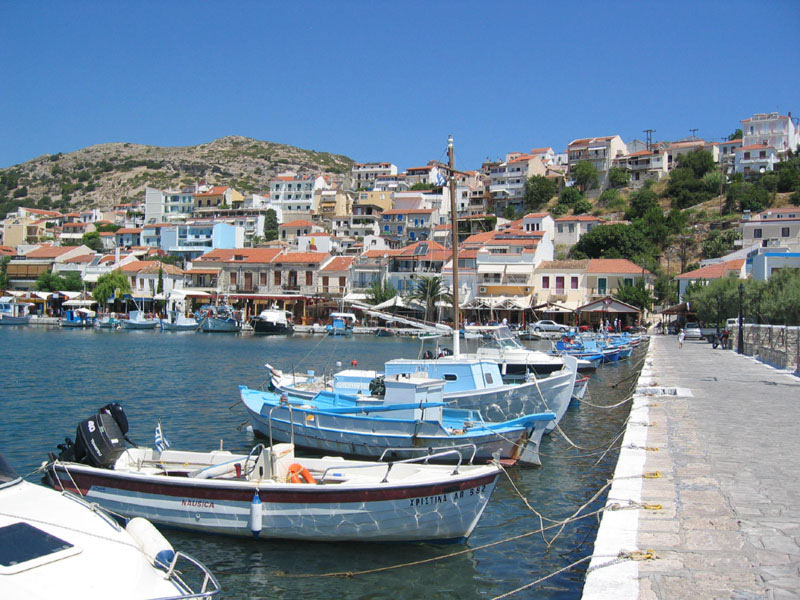
View of the harbour

Pythagorio is built on the ancient city of Samos. Some ruins of the ancient city are today incorporated in modern houses of Pythagorio. The ancient city reached affluence around 530 B.C. under the tyrant Polycrates. At that time Samos became a powerful nautical state. This power led to richness and prosperity, which is evident from great works of the period, such as the great aqueduct (part of it is the Tunnel of Eupalinos), temple of Heraion, and Samos harbour. Today many of these works can be seen in the modern town and nearby area. The ancient fortification also remains.

Samos was conquered by Persians and declined for a while. Samos flourished again for two short periods: First during the 3rd century under Ptolemy's rule (when lived Aristarchus), and second under Roman rule. The ruins of Roman period are visible today, about half a kilometre west of Pythagorio. The harbour of Samos remained important during the Byzantine period. Ruins of the Byzantine period are visible in the area of Logothetis' Tower on the west side of the harbour.

Samos totally declined during Frangokratia, when the coastal settlements depopulated. In the later Ottoman period the centre of the island was Chora, built inland, 4 km northwest of Pythagorio. During Greek War of Independence the Samian Leader Lykourgos Logothetis built a tower in Pythagorio between 1824 and 1827. In 1831 Logothetis built a church near the tower. Between 1859 and 1866 the new harbour was built in the same place as the ancient harbour, after which the settlement started to develop. The name of new settlement was originally Tigani, a corruption to the Italian “Dogana” that means "customs", but in 1955 renamed to Pythagorio after the name of famous ancient Greek Mathematician and Philosopher from Samos Pythagoras.

=== Historical population ===
Census	Settlement	Community	Municipal unit
1991	1,405		
2001	1,327	1,642	9,003
2011	1,272	1,500	7,996
2021	1,277	1,538	7,515

== Tourism and places of interest ==
Pythagorio is one of the most visited places of Samos since it has many archaeological sites as well as a big sandy beach. The most important sights in Pythagorio and the nearby area are:

- Tunnel of Eupalinos: a 1086-meter-long tunnel through Mount Kastro, which formed part of an ancient aqueduct. It is located about 2 km northwest of Pythagorio.
- Heraion of Samos: a very important archaeological site, with sanctuaries dedicated to Hera. It is located about 4 km west of Pythagorio and, along with Pythagorio, has been designated a World Heritage Site by UNESCO.
- Ancient harbour of Samos: The ancient harbour is located in the same place as the modern harbour. Herodotus describes a vast mole, but only a few traces have been detected archaeologically.
- Ancient theatre: a theatre of Roman period. It has been renovated and it is used for the local cultural festivals.

== Famous people ==
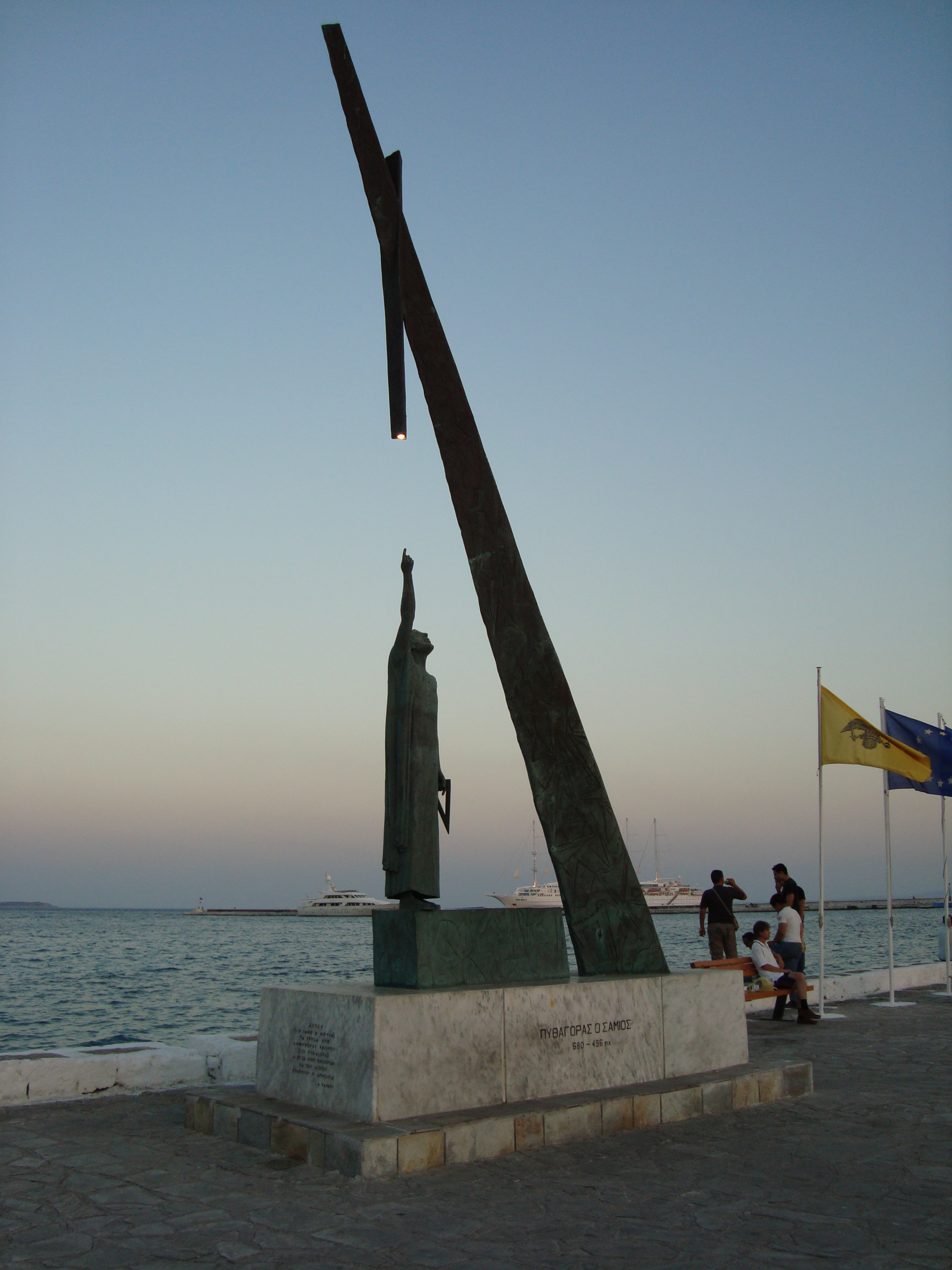
Statue of Pythagoras, located at the harbour

- Aristarchus of Samos, astronomer and mathematician, born in Pythagorio.
- Pythagoras, mathematician and philosopher, born in Pythagorio c. 580 BC.

== See also ==
- Pythagoreion and Heraion of Samos, for the Unesco Word Heritage site Pythagoreion and Heraion of Samos in Pythagorio
- Coming Forth by Day by Gabriel Levin, a book of poems written while sojourning on Pythagorio. Carcanet Press Ltd., Great Britain, 2014
