= Hazael horse frontlet =

Bronze armor piece discovered at the Heraion of Samos

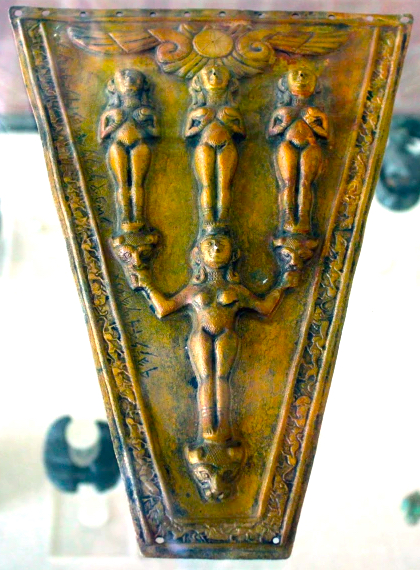
- Hazael horse frontlet in the Archaeological Museum of Vathi on Samos
- Height: 27.3 cm
- Created: c. 800 BC
- Discovered: 1984; North Aegean, Greece
- Present location: North Aegean, Greece

The Hazael horse frontlet is a bronze horse frontlet discovered at the Heraion of Samos, inscribed in Phoenician characters for Hazael (proposed by scholars to be the same as Hazael of Aram Damascus). It is considered to have been made in North Syria, perhaps at Arslan Tash. It is on display at the Archaeological Museum of Vathi at Samos (B2579). The inscription is known as KAI 311.

On its left side, starting from the top, it has a single line of inscription. The text translates as, "[This is] what Hadad has given from Unqi to our lord Hazael in the year when our lord had crossed the river."

== Discovery and description ==
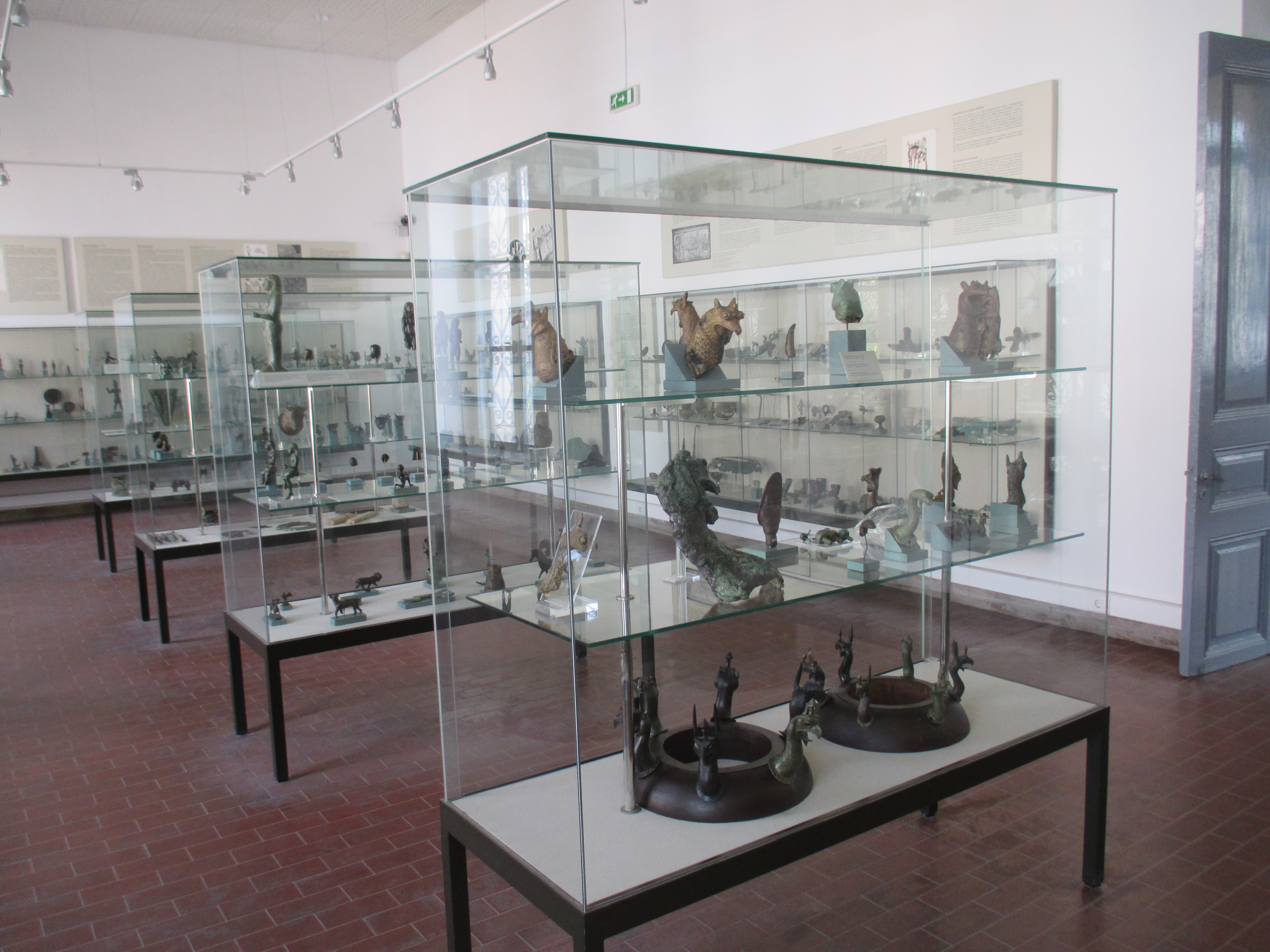
The horse frontlet in North Room 3 at the Archaeological Museum of Samos

It was found in 1984 at the Heraion of Samos. It is 27.3 centimetres (10.7 in) long.

On its left side, starting from the top, it has a single line of inscription, which can be read horizontally (from the right to the left) when the artefact is rotated by approximately 120 degrees clockwise. The text is 16 centimetres (6.3 in) long and consists of 36 characters that are between 3 and 9 millimetres (0.12 and 0.35 in) high. It is divided by a part of the figurative relief into two sequences, with 25 and 11 letters each, respectively. Otherwise, it contains no spaces or other word demarcations.

The text translates as, "[This is] what Hadad has given from Unqi to our lord Hazael in the year when our lord had crossed the river."
