= Kouros of Samos =

Ancient Greek sculpture

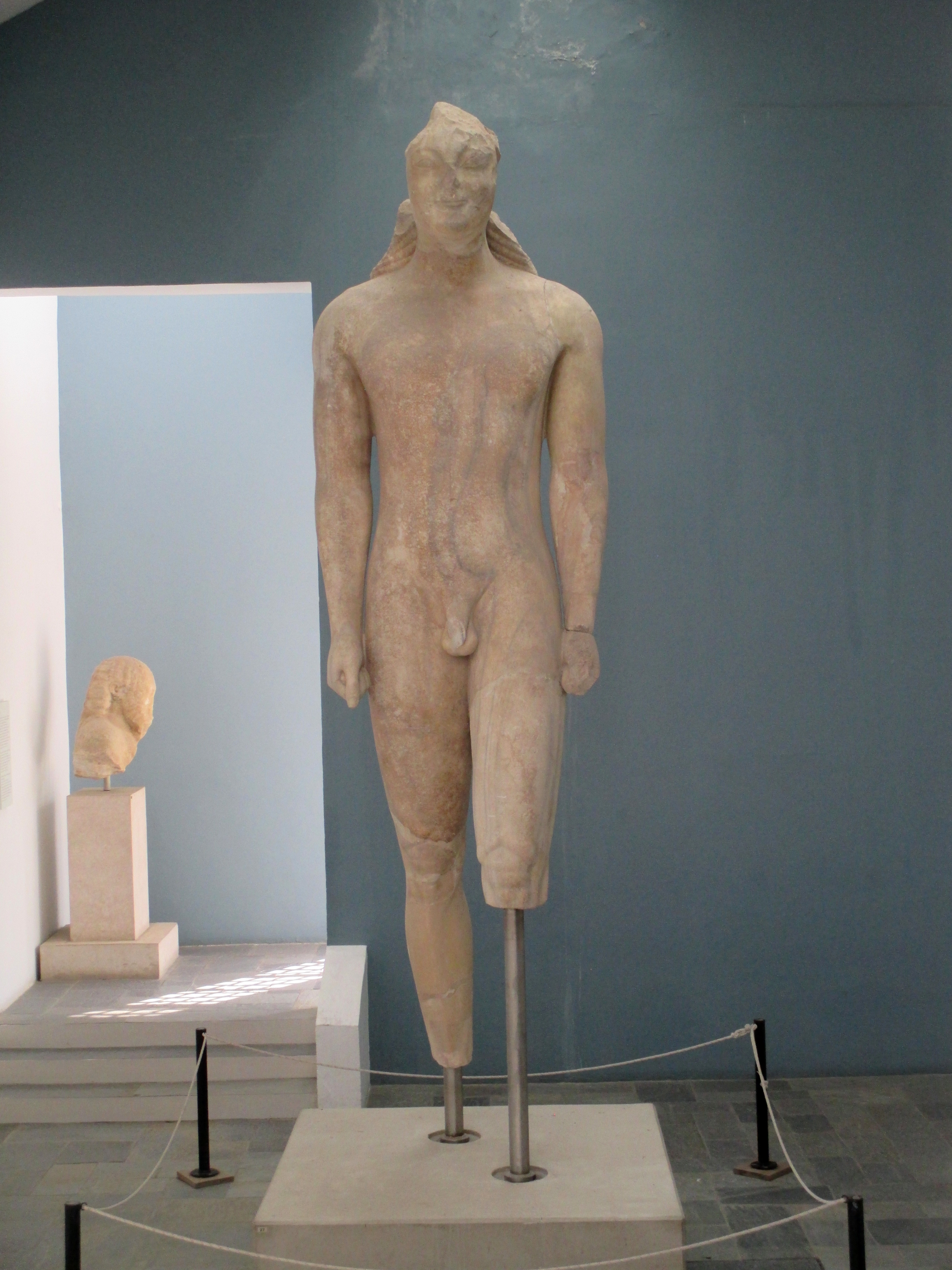
The Kouros of Samos in the Archaeological Museum of Samos.

The Kouros of Samos is an ancient Greek sculpture created in the 6th century BCE. On stylistic grounds it is attributed to a Samian artist, who probably made it on Samos itself.

In September 1980, a German team of archaeologists uncovered the marble statue during a routine topographical excavation on the Sacred Way in the Heraion. The Kouros stands 5.25 meters tall and its body is mostly intact. Its head remained missing until autumn of 1984 when it was found and joined to the rest of the body. The Kouros now stands in the Samos Archaeological Museum.

According to the inscription on the left thigh of the Kouros, it was a dedication made in the sanctuary by one Isches, son of Rhesis (Ἰσχῆς ἀνέθηκεν ὁ Ῥήσιος), who is not otherwise known. Aideen Carty proposes that he was one of the Geomori who ruled Samos in the early sixth century BC.

== Bibliography ==
- Helmut Kyrieleis: The large kouros of Samos. In: Great Moments in Greek Archaeology. J. Paul Getty Museum Los Angeles 2007, p. 338-341.
- Helmut Kyrieleis: Der große Kuros von Samos (= Samos Vol. 10). Habelt, Bonn 1996, ISBN 3-7749-2771-5
