= Geomori (Samos) =

Oligarchical government in Samos, Greece

The Geomori (Ancient Greek: Γεωμόροι, 'land-sharers') were a group of wealthy aristocrats who ruled Samos as an oligarchy in the seventh or sixth century BC. They remained an important political group on Samos into the fifth century BC.

== History ==
=== Rise and fall ===
The main source for the rule of the Geomori is a passage in the Greek Questions, written by the philosopher Plutarch, in which he attempts to explain the name of a banqueting hall in Samos. Although Plutarch lived in the Roman Imperial period, he had access to earlier sources, such as Aristotle and Duris and may be reliable.

According to Plutarch, the Geomori murdered the last king of Samos, Demoteles, and established an oligarchy. The date of this event is uncertain - it must fall after the reign of Amphicrates (fl. 700 or 600 BC). The name of the group, 'land-sharers', is one associated with aristocratic groups in Athens and Syracuse in the same period, so they are usually interpreted as a group of landed aristocrats. Aideen Carty argues that they were a lower-ranking group in the aristocracy, who had received land in the territory seized by the Samians on mainland Asia Minor after the destruction of the city of Melia. She places their rise to power around 590 BC and links it to the decline of the Klima cemetery near the Heraion and the erection of the Kouros of Samos.

At some point between 600 BC and 570 BC, the people of Megara launched an attack on the Samian colony of Perinthus. The Geomori appointed nine generals to take a force of thirty ships to help Perinthus. These generals were successful and took six hundred Megarians prisoner. The Geomori commanded that the prisoners be brought to them in chains, but the nine generals secretly made a deal with the prisoners and removed the pins from their shackles. When the prisoners were brought into the council house where the Geomori met, they killed them. The nine generals then took control of the city and granted the Megarian prisoners citizenship.

The government that replaced the Geomori has often been interpreted as a democracy, but Aideen Carty argues that it is more likely that it was another oligarchy. Carty also connects this new regime with the start of sumptuous burials in the West Cemetery, near Samos town, and suggests that this new government was responsible for the Tunnel of Eupalinos, which was designed by a Megarian. It is not clear how long this government lasted. Polycrates established a tyranny around 540 BC and his father Aeaces may have reigned before that.

=== Subsequent history ===
The Geomori remained a force in Samian politics after their overthrow. In the fifth century, when Samos was part of the Athenian empire, there was an ongoing conflict between a democratic and an oligarchic faction. Late in the Peloponnesian War, the oligarchic group was in power and from Thucydides we know that this group was called the Geomori. In 412 BC, Samian democrats, with the help of some Athenian naval crews stationed on the island, overthrew these oligarchs, killing two hundred of them and exiling four hundred others. The Geomoroi were barred from Samian citizenship and forbidden to intermarry with Samian citizens. However, in 411 BC there was an oligarchic coup in Athens, and the new government attempted to establish oligarchic governments in the cities under Athenian control. In Samos this could have returned the Geomori to power, but the Samian democrats and the Athenian naval crews on Samos joined forces against the oligarchs. This marked a significant setback for the Athenian oligarchic government and the Athenian naval crews subsequently played an important role in the fall of the oligarchy in Athens.

== Bibliography ==
- Barron, John P. (1964). "The Sixth-Century Tyranny at Samos". The Classical Quarterly. 14 (2): 210–229. doi:10.1017/S0009838800023764. JSTOR 637725.
- Schmidt, G. (1974). "Eine Brychon-Weihung und ihre Fundlage". Mitteilungen des Deutschen archäologischen Instituts zu Athen. 87: 165–185.
- Shipley, Graham J. (1987). A History of Samos, 800-188 BC. Oxford: Oxford University Press. pp. 37–39. ISBN 9780198148685.
- Carty, Aideen (2015). Polycrates, Tyrant of Samos: New Light on Archaic Greece. Stuttgart: Franz Steiner Verlag. pp. 28–34. ISBN 9783515108980.
