= List of settlements in Samos =

This is a list of settlements in the island of Samos, Greece.

- Agioi Theodoroi
- Agios Konstantinos
- Ampelos
- Chora
- Drakaioi
- Kallithea
- Karlovasi
- Kastania
- Kokkari
- Kontaiika
- Kontakaiika
- Kosmadaioi
- Koumaiika
- Koumaradaioi
- Leka
- Manolates
- Marathokampos
- Mavratzaioi
- Mesogeio
- Myloi
- Mytilinioi
- Neochori
- Pagondas
- Palaiokastro
- Pandroso
- Platanos
- Pyrgos
- Pythagoreio
- Samos
- Skouraiika
- Spatharaioi
- Stavrinides
- Vathy
- Vourliotes
- Ydroussa

== See also ==
- List of towns and villages in Greece
