= Kontakaiika =

Kontakaiika Κοντακαίικα
- Community
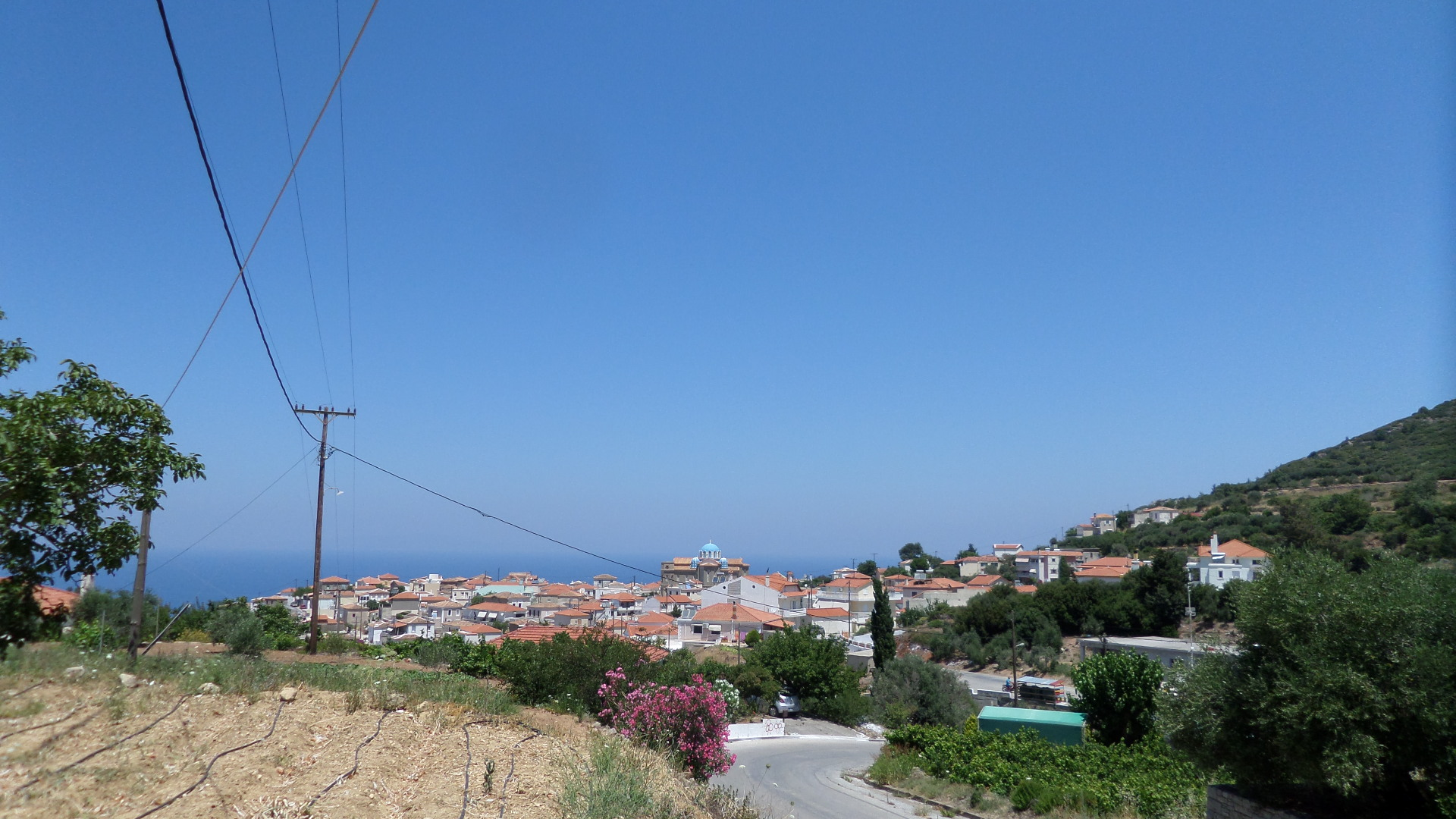

- Location within Greece
- Coordinates: 37°48′07″N 26°44′40″E
- Country: Greece
- Administrative region: North Aegean
- Regional unit: Samos
- Municipality: West Samos
- Municipal unit: Karlovasi
- Elevation: 150 m (490 ft)

Population (2021)
  - Community: 1,076
- Time zone: UTC+2 (EET)
  - Summer (DST): UTC+3 (EEST)
- Postal code: 83200
- Area code: +22730

Kontakaiika (Greek: Κοντακαίικα, also known as Kontakeika) is a Greek village in the northwestern part of Samos, 5 km from Karlovasi. The village belongs to the municipality of West Samos. According to the 2021 census, the village has 1,076 inhabitants.

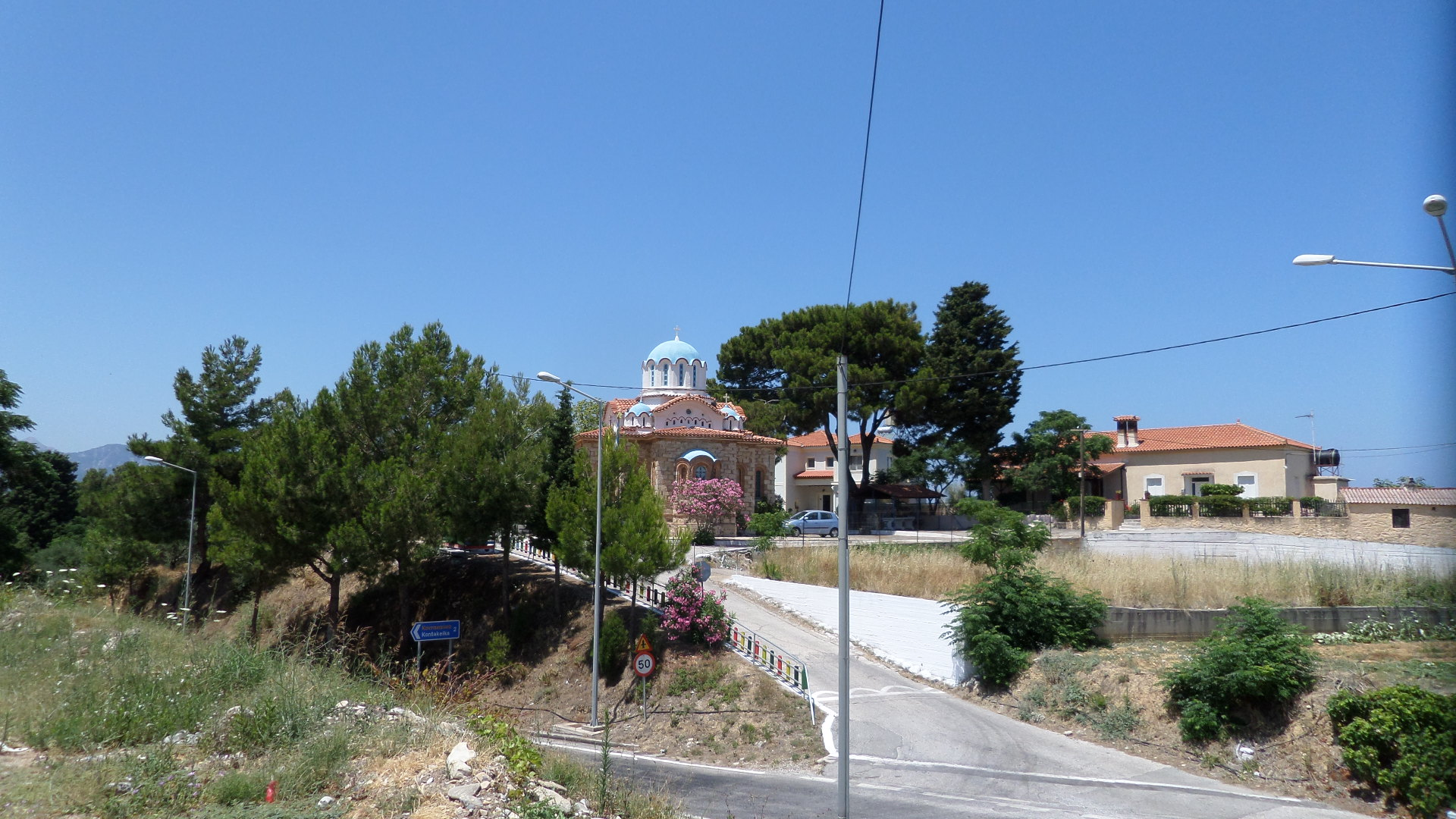
Right before the crossroad leading to the village

== Origin and naming ==
After the middle of the 15th century AD the island of Samos was abandoned by its inhabitants almost completely. But the misery and suffering had begun earlier. The raids of Turkish and Arab pirates had made life unbearable. The devastating pressures on the island's population have resulted in its gradual desolation.

Residents sought refuge on islands such as Mytilene and Chios, but also on the opposite coast of Asia Minor.

The abandonment of the island led the inhabitants who remained in it, to live on inaccessible areas, invisible from the sea side.

Crops were abandoned and the island now looked like a wild place with lush vegetation.After the middle of the 16th century, in the context of a broader policy for the Aegean, the Turks sought to repopulate the island from the descendants of the old inhabitants or from young people, completely foreign to the island, inhabitants.

Thus, Greeks from all over Greece began to arrive in Samos. From Mytilene, the coasts of Asia Minor, the Peloponnese, Chios and other places. One of these young inhabitants, according to Stamatiadis, came from the island of Kos, around 1750 AD. In "Samiaka", Stamatiadis mentions the following: Kontakaiika and the best Kotakaiika, are located on a fertile hill 150 meters above the sea. According to tradition, in 1750 AD George Kotis came from Kos and after buying lands he started to cultivate them. Later, his sons married women from the nearby village of Fourni (today's Ydroussa), brought them to their father's estates, built their houses here and became the first inhabitants of the village to be named Kotakaiika or Kontakaiika with the addition of "n" when pronouncing of the word. The modern inhabitants, as far as the origin of the name of the village is concerned, mention Kontakis as the first inhabitant, others as someone from Kontakiotis, and others as agree with Stamatiadis point of view.

== Castle ==
As we saw earlier in the historical period, from 1475 to 1573 AD. the pirates carried out repeated robberies on the island. As a result, the island was almost deserted.The few remaining inhabitants had no hope of surviving living in lowland areas, visible to pirates. Thus was found the solution of the habitation of steep areas, invisible from the sea side. These places became known as Castles or Little Castles.Castles were created and inhabited mainly on the northern side of the island, such as those near today's Avlakia, near Vourliotes and near the village.

The main features of a Castle were about common to most of them. So we are always talking about steep, inaccessible places, with only one road leading there. Around them were built walls to protect the inhabitants, while in the main area there were reservoirs for rainwater, the huts of the inhabitants and a church.

Near the Castle there had to be arable land so that the inhabitants could produce mainly vegetables for their basic nutritional needs.

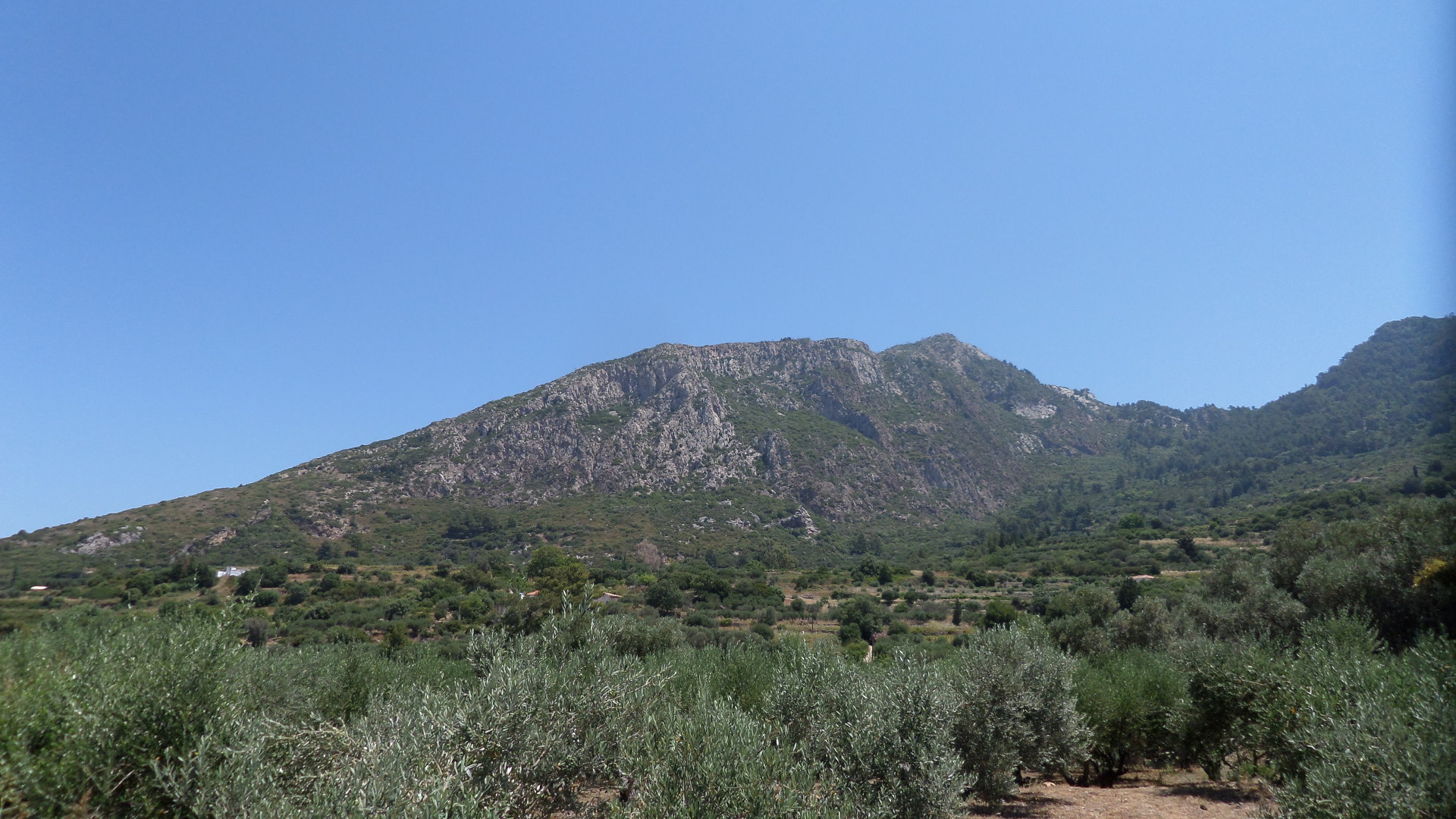
Mountain near the village

For their defense and timely notification in case of pirates, the residents had placed viglators. The vigilantes from their villas, their observatories, gazed at the sea all day and alerted in any way they could, mainly by lighting fires, so that the inhabitants could return quickly to the Castle and secure its usually strong and durable door.Those residents who were away from the Castle at the time were rushing to shelter in places they already knew and were destined for emergency shelters.

Kritikidis, in his treatise On the desolation and openness of Samos states that 350 houses and 2 temples were built in Kastrovouni of Kontakaiika.

Kontakaiika is the possible capital of Samos at that time, as well as the seat of the Governor and the Bishop of the island.

Let's see what Stamatiadis says in his "Samiaka" about the Castle of the village:West of Kontakaika and at an altitude of 950 meters rises Kastrovouni, at the top of which are preserved ancient reservoirs and ruins of walls and coves that testify that once there was a fortress here. Locals say the fortress was built during the years when the Genoese ruled the island. A relief depicting a man and a woman sitting on a stool opposite a tripod was also found in the area. Almost in the middle of the plateau that forms on Kastrovouni, the ruins of the church of Agios Nikolaos are preserved, for which the simplistic inhabitants narrate "many waves of ignorance and superstition.The existence of the Castle was not noticed by the pirates, until one day an elderly woman, a resident of the Castle, descended to the foot of the hill, in the current area of the Holy Trinity.The pirates arrested her there and after torturing her, they learned about the existence of the Castle and the road that led there, from the Royal Village.This was followed by a surprise attack by pirates and the destruction of the Castle.

Years later, Stamatiadis described the Castle of the village, the ruins of a second church, that of Agios Konstantinos, were also discovered. Many residents of the village go up to this place even today for a pilgrimage on Easter days where the churches of the Castle operate.

== History ==
The contribution of the residents of the village to the historical events that occupied the island of Samos and Greece in general is memorable.

We have recorded historical testimonies about the participation of the village in the struggles of the homeland for three great struggles:

- The struggles of Samos to be liberated by the Turks and to unite with the rest of Greece
- The Balkan wars in Greece in 1912-1913
- The resistance to World War II

On June 6, 1834, the people of Samos sent two letters to the Turks, making it clear that Samos would not submit to the sultan. The ardent desire of the island to unite with the rest of Greece, which had just been declared an independent state, is also co-signed by the residents of the village to Hasabey, commander of the Turkish fleet, who arrived on the island in April 1834.

During the Balkan wars of 1912-1913, the village gave many fighters, who for this reason started from the island and arrived in the long-suffering Macedonia, uniting their bodies with those of the Macedonian warriors. The Hero in the square of the village stood up in honor of the fallen Kontakiotes in the Struggle for the liberation of Macedonia.

In his column there are warriors of the village: Alexios Markou, Andreas Margaronis, Konstantinos Haritou, Stavros Karaggiaouris, Prodromos Kotakis, Nikolaos Pothas, Konstantinos Lambrou, Elias Christodoulou, Emmanouillon Antoniou, Antoniou Stanoulou, Konstantinos Hatzitoulis Elias Pothas.

During World War II, the island of Samos followed the fate of the conquered homeland. There were no battles on the island for its conquest. Historians typically report that not a single rifle fell, but was handed over to the Italian administration under unclear historical circumstances.

However, the winter of 1941-1942, with the island under Italian occupation, led the Samians to despair, with the deaths of the inhabitants from starvation that had no precedent. Hunger, disease and the sight of the Italian conqueror woke the inhabitants of the island.

So it was not long before a Greek Resistance was organized in the mountains of central and western mainly Samos, where the Karvounis and Kerkis Mountains could give the Greeks the coverage they needed. the village was thus in the zone of the events of the Resistance. A group of fighters settled here and after fighting, the village was occupied by the Italian army. On September 8, 1943, the Allied Powers and Italy signed a truce in Samos.

The supervision of the island passes to the British, while the command of the Greek guerrillas again establishes in the village a company of soldiers as a militia, with the main purpose of preserving the order and security of the people.

However, the time for release had not yet arrived. On November 17, 1943, the Germans savagely bombed Vathi and Pythagorion.

The Greek troops, which consisted of soldiers of the Holy Corps and EAM guerrillas, along with a large population of civilians and a small number of English soldiers, leave the island and leave it in the hands of the Germans. The Germans arrested and executed Italian soldiers who were opposed to fascist Italy and had sided with the Greeks.

One such execution took place in Ag. Dimitrios in Kontakaiika. Finally, in September 1944, German occupation troops withdrew, and the islanders breathed a sigh of relief.

== Demographics and settlements ==
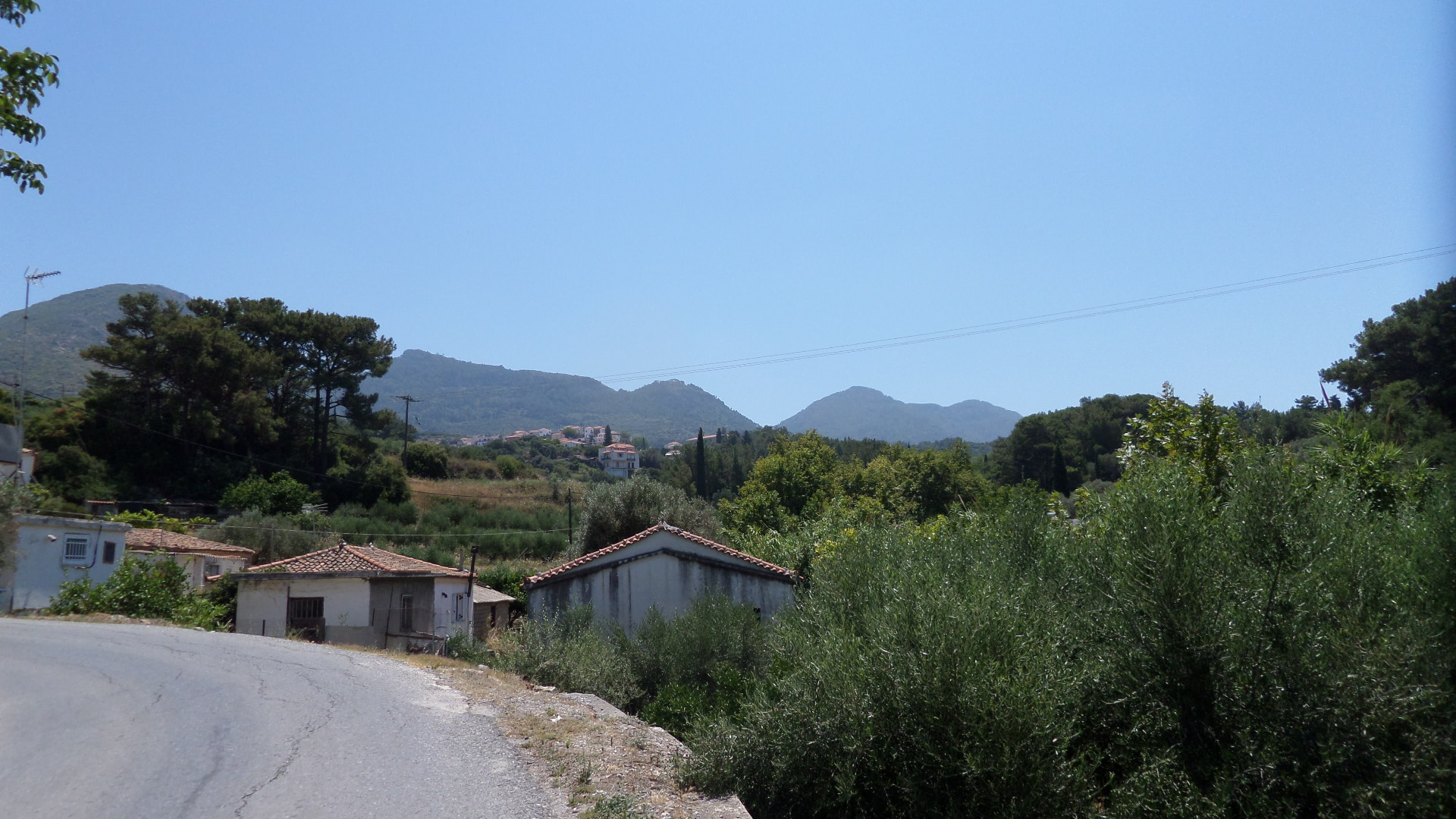
Small houses in the village

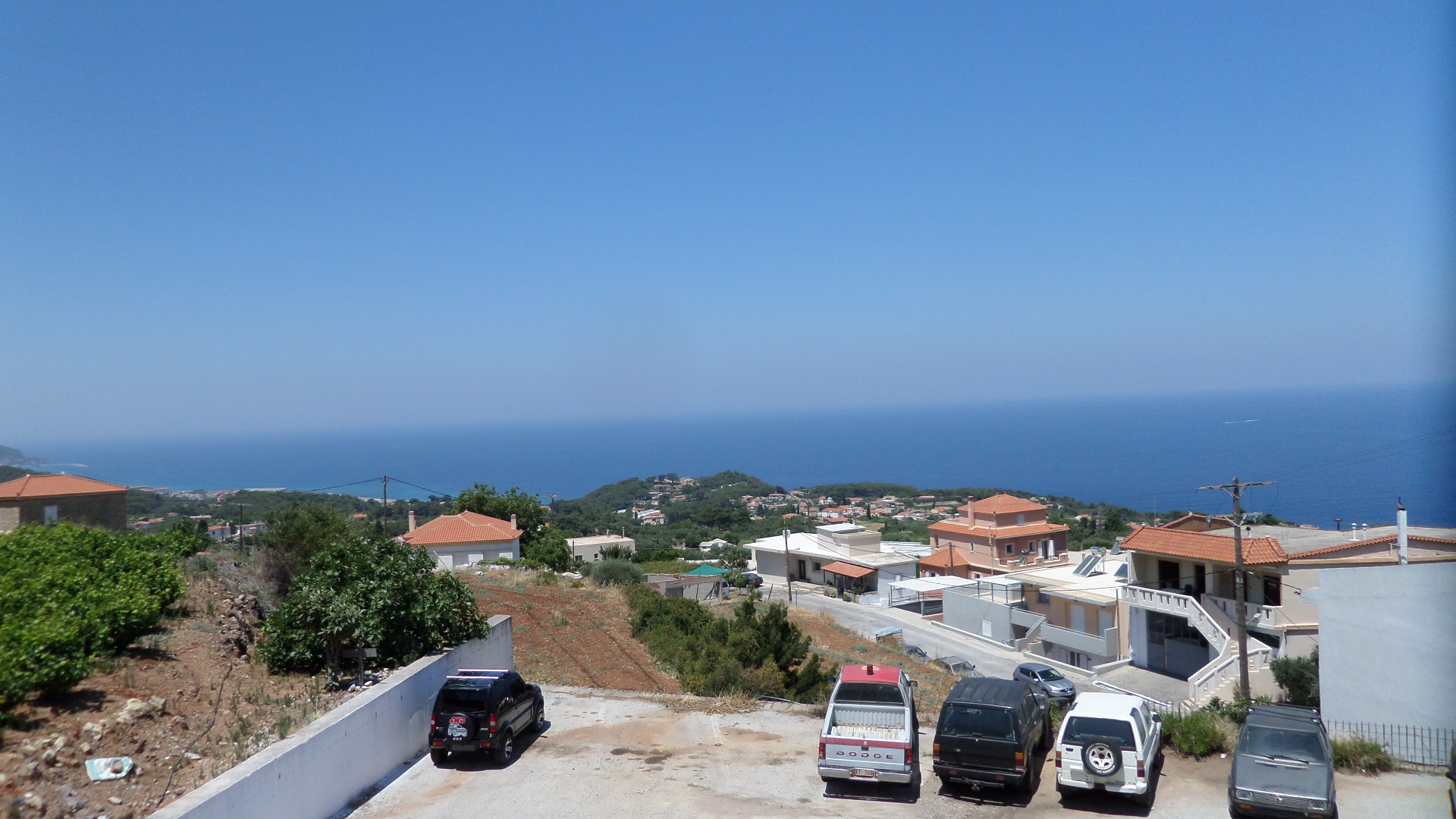
Roads inside the village

The numbers speak for the history of the village and its settlements.

When one examines the historical presence of the village, one does not have the luxury of leaving out the important elements for the evolution of the population in the past decades and centuries that it discovers.

So looking for such data, we find the first record of the inhabitants of the village in 1828.

That year the village has a population of 272 indigenous people. Of these, 138 were men and 134 were women. At that time, 25 residents lived in the village, raising the total population to 297 people. 84 houses were built in the village and there was an olive mill and a mill.

Shortly before 1890, there were 806 permanent residents in the village, of whom 155 were men, 178 were women and 473 children, 258 boys and 215 girls. The village consisted of 176 families while the number of houses built was 188.

We draw important written information about the historical presence of the village from the official census of the inhabitants in 1920. This census is the first official one carried out by the Greek state on the island. The population of the Kontakaiiks was 1197, of whom 540 were men and 657 women. In addition to the main village, 14 settlements are mentioned in this census, which are:

- Saint Demetrius
- Saint Nicholas
- Thalassinides
- Kato Kalivia
- Koliobetsides
- Cosmasmades
- Houvardades
- Makraioi
- Macroglides
- Manoloukides
- Hatziantonides
- Hatzipanagiotides and
- Hatzistamoulides

And eight years after the 1928 census, in addition to the main village, 18 settlements are reported. The settlement of Makraioi is no longer mentioned, while the settlements appear:

- Karyotakides
- Kastanides
- Matsoukides and
- Chramides

The total number of inhabitants, according to this census, increased to 1365, of whom 680 were men and 685 women.

The next census on the island in 1940 shows 1464 inhabitants in the village, of whom 740 were men and 724 were women. Unfortunately, from this census onwards, no reference is made to the settlements of the village, so that today we know exactly the evolution of each of them. This year the village has the largest population in its historical course.

According to the 1951 census, the village has 1183 inhabitants, of which 552 were men and 631 women. A new statistic added is the population density per square kilometer. Thus, this year there are 147.88 inhabitants per sq. Km.

From the data we have for the censuses of 1961 and 1971, it is worth noting that the population of the village was 1092 in 1961 and 818 in 1971, respectively.

From the 1981 census we derive much more information about the village and the living conditions of the inhabitants. Their number is 825 for this year. The distribution of the population according to their age, in a sample of 670 people, shows that the majority of the population is between 19 and 64 years old (360 people), followed by the inhabitants up to 18 years old (180 people) and the inhabitants over 64 years old. (130 people). Of the same sample of residents, 540 are said to be at least literate, 20 are at least high school graduates and 50 are illiterate. In 460 normal houses in the village, 160 do not have electricity, 360 do not have a bathroom, 390 do not have central heating, 30 do not have a kitchen, 100 do not have water supply and 130 do not have sewerage.

The village occupies an area of 8,300 acres, of which 2,500 acres are cultivated areas, 4,300 acres are private pastures, 1,300 acres are forests and 200 acres are the area occupied by settlements.

During the 1991 census, the Statistical Service carried out a very systematic census and recording of the inhabitants and their homes, from which a lot of information emerges about the life of the inhabitants in the days close to the years.

The population in this census was 888, of whom 431 were men and 457 were women. The exact distribution of the population according to their age is as follows:

- 0–14 years: 192 people
- 15–29 years: 185 people
- 30–44 years: 142 people
- 45–64 years: 219 people
- 65 years and over: 150 people

Of the 888 residents, 284 were financially active, of whom 151 were self-employed and 105 were employed. The distribution of the economically active population by profession was as follows:

- 100 were engaged in agriculture, animal husbandry and fishing.
- 51 was involved in construction.
- 43 engaged in trade, repairs, hotels or restaurants.
- 26 were involved in the manufacturing industries.
- 24 residents worked in various services.
- 20 residents were involved in transportation, storage and communications.
- 2 residents are reported as young.
- 1 resident worked in electricity, gas and water service, while
- 17 residents did not declare economic activity.

Apart from the number of inhabitants and the data concerning the living potential of the village, we also have rich data for the households and the buildings of the village.

318 households were recorded, of which:

- All had a kitchen
- 313 electric
- 173 phone
- 219 bath
- 314 water supply
- 31 central heating
- 235 had a toilet and
- 225 were drained

During the 1991 census, the buildings of the village were also counted. 709 buildings were counted, of which:

- 483 were homes
- 15 churches and monasteries
- 3 were hotels
- 10 factories and workshops
- 1 school building
- 16 stores and offices
- 13 car stations (parking) and finally
- 168 buildings declared for other uses

As for the year of construction of the buildings recorded, most of them were built during the years 1919-1945, followed by the period between the years 1946-1960, then the buildings built before 1919, buildings between the years 1971-1980 and finally buildings between the years 1961-1970 and finally buildings built during the period 1981-1991.

As it is obvious from the antiquity of the buildings, the materials used for the construction of 411 of them were stone, in 245 buildings bricks and concrete were used, while the rest of the buildings were made of concrete blocks, wood and other materials.

Finally, according to the recent 2001 census, there are 906 inhabitants in the village.

Most of the settlements in the village have now been abandoned, others have now been integrated with the main village. There are also cases where some new houses have been built near the ruined houses of abandoned settlements. The reason for their abandonment should not be sought in the reduction of the population, for the simple reason that the population of the village has not decreased over the decades, but not to the extent that the rural population has decreased in the rest of Greece.

It is enough to look at the census of 1920 (1197 inhabitants) and the recent one of 2001 (906 inhabitants) (DECISION 2011) To understand the constant presence of the inhabitants in the village. The reason for the creation of the settlements was mainly the need of many residents to live close to their crops, in order to facilitate as much as possible their already exhausting daily life.

== Primary school ==
According to the London Protocol, Samos was declared a hegemony. The reign of the island lasted from 1834 to 1912. The first ruler of Samos, Stefanos Vogoridis, sent his Commissioner Alexios Fotiadis to proclaim the work of the Second General Assembly of Samia on 5-2-1837. At this Assembly, it was decided to establish five Greek Schools on the island:

- In the Port of Vathi
- To the Vourliotes
- In Karlovassi
- In Marathokampos and
- In Hora

== Churches and chapels ==
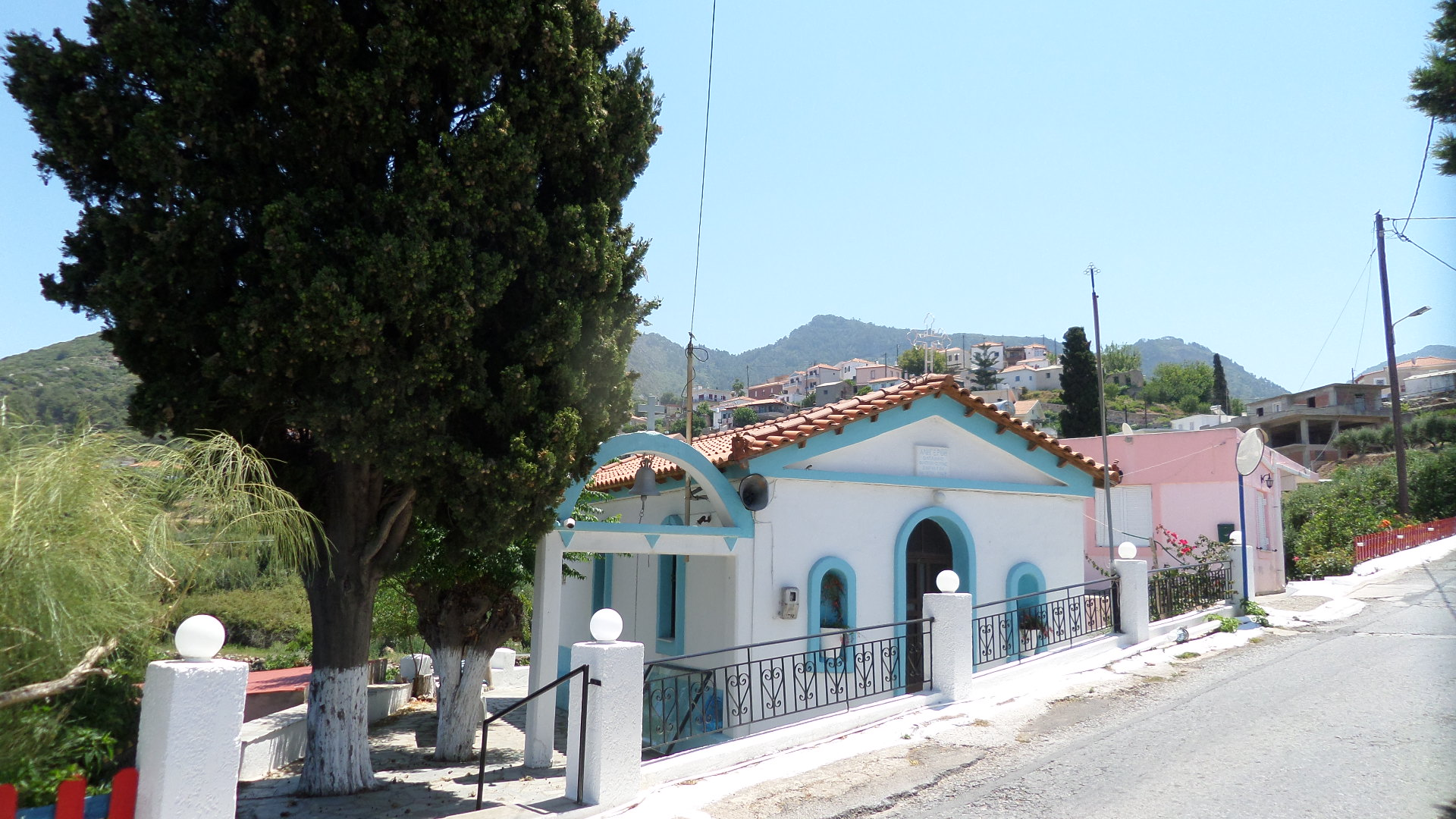
A chapel inside the village

Undoubtedly, the churches and chapels undoubtedly occupy an important place in the buildings of the village. One would even say that it may be disproportionately large in relation to the number of inhabitants. What is certain is that their existence testifies to the intense religious feeling that the village breathes. In fact, many are historic buildings of exceptional style for the whole island. Some brief information about the churches and chapels of the village are as follows:

- Church of the Assumption of the Virgin Mary
- Agios Dimitrios
- Agios Nikolaos
- Prophet Elias
- Agios Dimitrios
- Transfiguration of the Savior
- Temple of the Holy Cross
- St. Anna and All Saints
- Income of the Virgin Mary
- Saint George
- Agioi Anargyroi
- Agios Ioannis Theologos
- Saint Nektarios
- St. Catherine
