= Agios Konstantinos, Samos =

Agios Konstantinos Άγιος Κωνσταντίνος
- Community
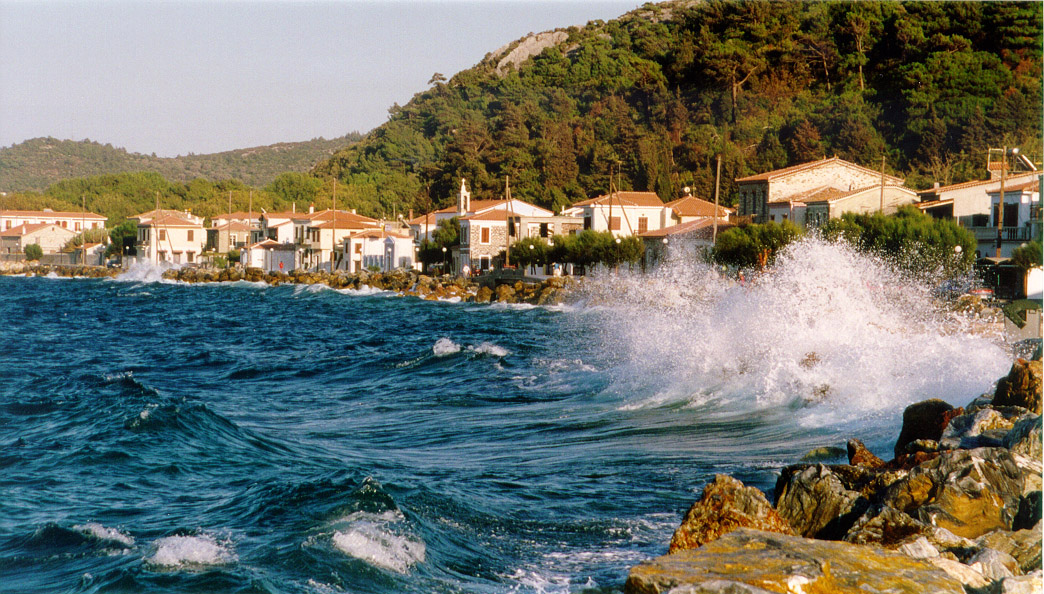
- Agios Konstantinos around 1980

- Location within Greece
- Coordinates: 37°48′29″N 26°48′58″E
- Country: Greece
- Administrative region: North Aegean
- Regional unit: Samos
- Municipality: East Samos
- Municipal unit: Vathy

Population (2021)
  - Community: 331
- Time zone: UTC+2 (EET)
  - Summer (DST): UTC+3 (EEST)

Agios Konstantinos is a coastal village on the northern shores of the Greek island Samos between the island’s two major towns: Karlovasi, west 10 kilometres (6 mi) by road, and Vathy, east 20 kilometres (12 mi) by road.

The village faces the waters of the Aegean Sea. Stretched behind a narrow pebble beach and a protective stone wall Agios Konstantinos ascends into a patch work of stepped garden plots and forest intermittent by agricultural canals that ultimately source from natural streams further up the mountain. Agios Konstantinos strictly consists of two zones. A narrow beachfront zone flanked by the main Vathy-Karlovasi road above and the sea below is referred to as Agios Konstantinos itself, while a zone across the main road elevates to form Ano (Upper) Agios Konstantinos.

== History ==
The origin of Agios Konstantinos is obscure, with early maps of the Samos island not revealing the village. Around 1700 the only documented settlement in the north central region of Samos is Vourliotes nested inland up the mountain and sheltered down to the sea by forest (reported by Joseph Georgirenes in the 1670 and Tournefort in 1702). Towards the end of the 18th century it is thought that a growing population in the region predominating from Vourliotes but also supplemented from farther afield resulted in the establishment of other nearby settlements. By the beginning of the 19th century six feature settlements developed including Agios Konstantinos, along with Nenedes (today's Ampelos), Manolates, Stavrinides, Margarites and Valeontades. At the end of the Greek War of Independence (1821-1829) the island of Samos, despite strong local support and pressure, was not included in the newly formed Greek Kingdom. Instead, albeit under duress, Samos in 1834 became an autonomous principality under Ottoman suzerainty, which lasted until 1912 when Samos was finally united to the Greek Kingdom. During the period of the Principality (1834-1912), the six villages were known as the municipality of Exi Geitonies or "Six Neighborhoods".

== Population and Economy ==
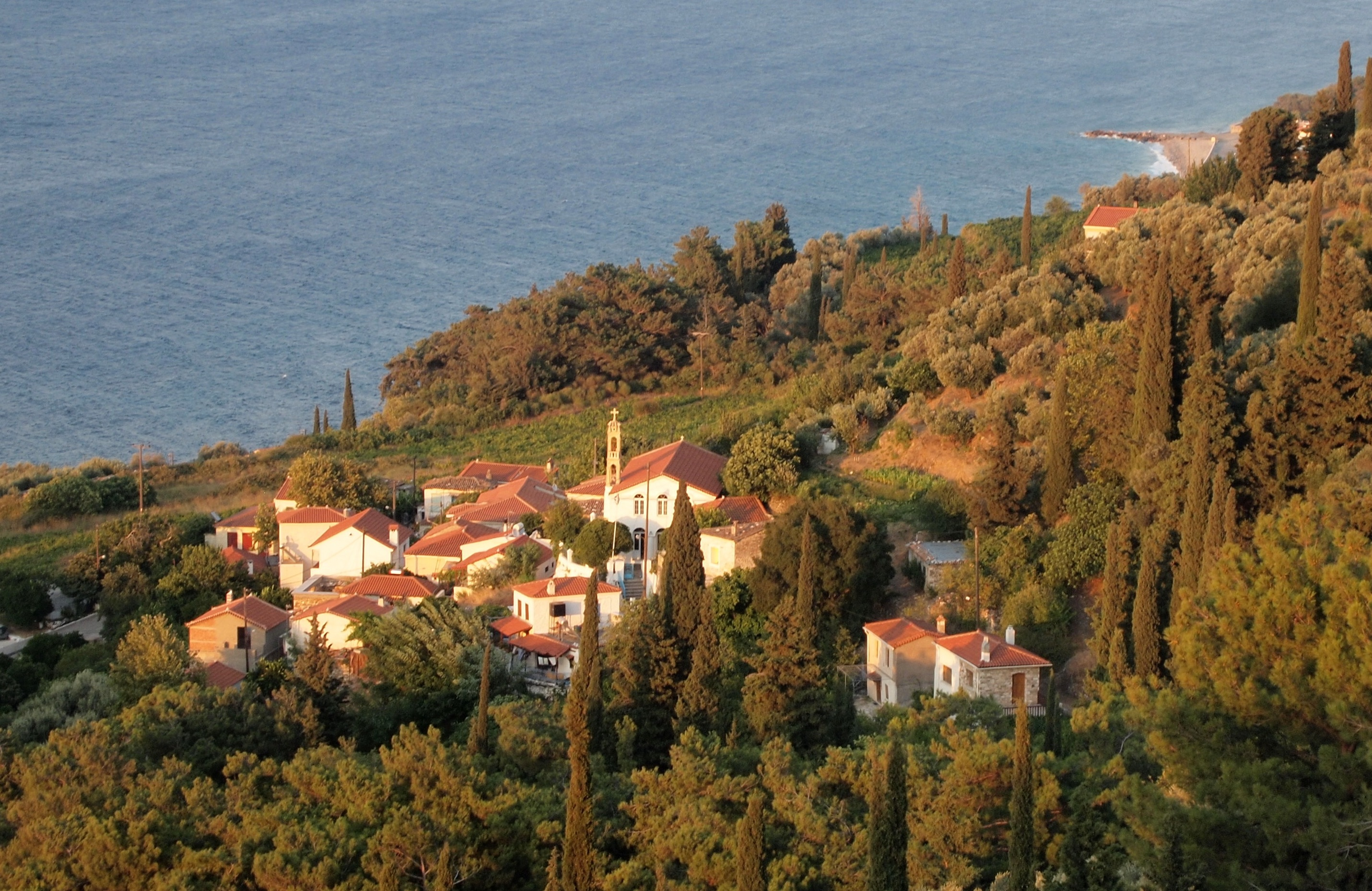
Ano (Upper) Agios Konstantinos.

An 1828 census records for Agios Konstantinos 254 inhabitants with 112 men and 141 women. Agios Konstantinos was then mostly in place of the present day Ano (Upper) Agios Konstantinos. The lower beachfront settlement consisted mainly of a few wine warehouses closer to where shipping was accessible. Continued development of wine production in the region supported the population to reach 600 by 1920 and 800 by the end of the decade, which by then also included some refugees from the nearby Asia Minor Catastrophe.

From Tournefort’s accounts in 1702 central northern Samos was primarily uncultivated forest. By the nineteenth century the region had developed into an agrarian economy. Records reveal that in 1828 Agios Konstantinos produced 8000 "cargoes" of wine (with a cargo being a quantity that can be carried by a donkey or mule). Wine remained the main produce and source of revenue into the twentieth century with the wines of Agios Konstantinos joining others in the region to gain recognition as light desert wines with export markets. Following wine, olives and fruit trees also were significant produce from Agios Konstantinos.

The electoral list of 1914, records for occupied males 61 farmers, 16 sailors, 10 merchants, 4 coffee shop owners, 3 grocers, 2 butchers, an office worker, a ship builder and a ship hull repairer. Those engaged in traditional crafts included 4 carpenters, 3 chair-makers, 2 coopers, 2 millers and 2 blacksmiths and a picture frame maker. In more professional occupations were recorded 2 teachers, a doctor and a hotel employee (who was working in the capital). We can add to these priests of the area and some passing-by officers, i.e. gendarmes, and one customs officer. Women were typically indicated to be engaged with "home duties” or “women's duties", however, it is known that most women were also taking part in agricultural and other jobs.

After World War II the population of Agios Konstantinos slowly dwindled to 394 inhabitants by 2001. Contributing factors were the decline of the local agrarian economy, urbanisation towards Athens, and overseas immigration particularly to America and Australia. Today the economy of the Agios Konstantinos is focused towards tourism and less on agriculture and wine.

== Traditional Architecture ==
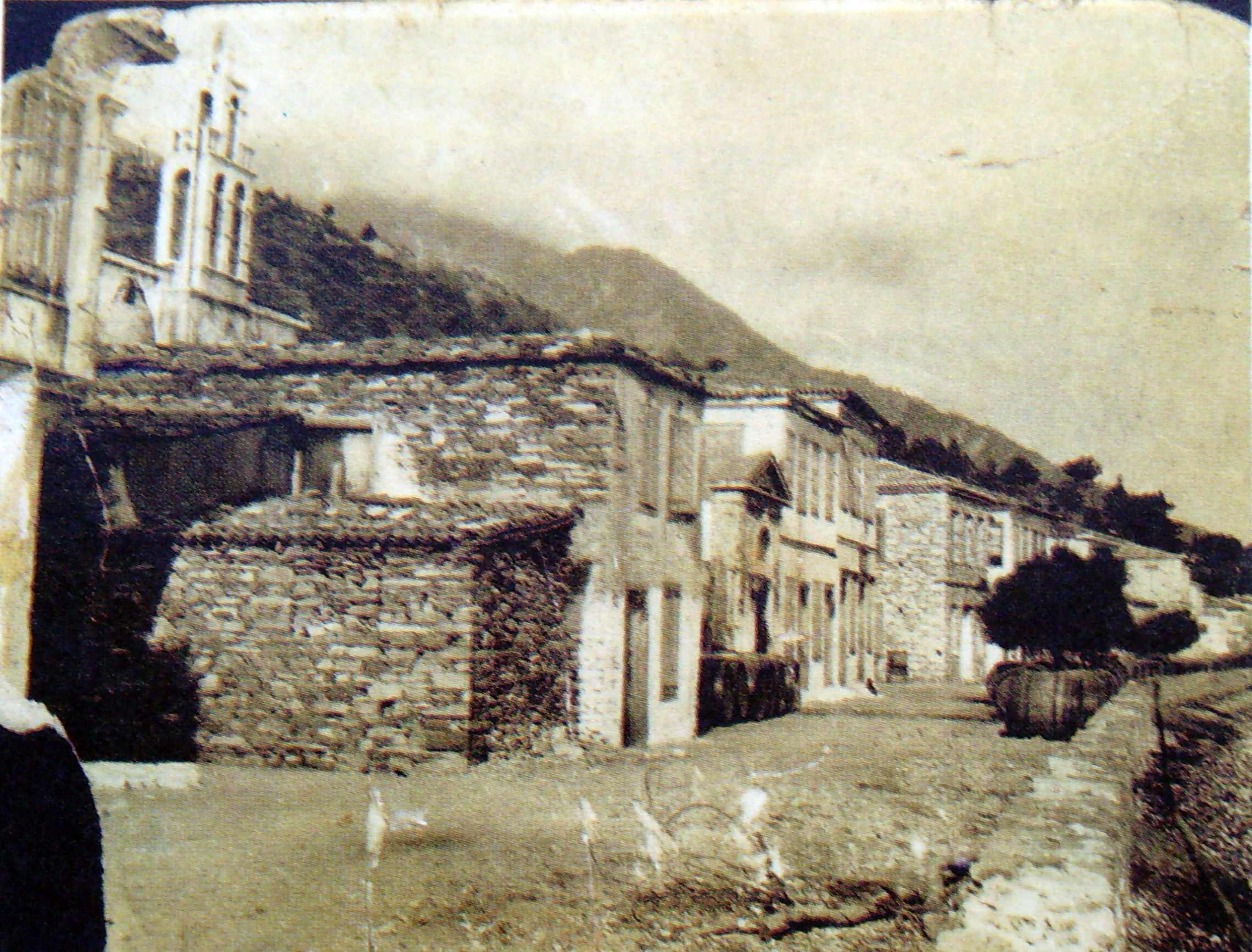
Houses and rows of barrels on the beach of Agios Konstantinos, pre-war.

Early photographs of Agios Konstantinos from around 1900 help reveal the architecture dating as far back as 1800. These photographs typically show Agios Konstantinos as a stretch of beachfront houses near a pebble beach close to the water. The houses are mostly dual-level, but a few are single-level. Evident also in the styling is a Near East influence reflecting the close proximity to Asia Minor.

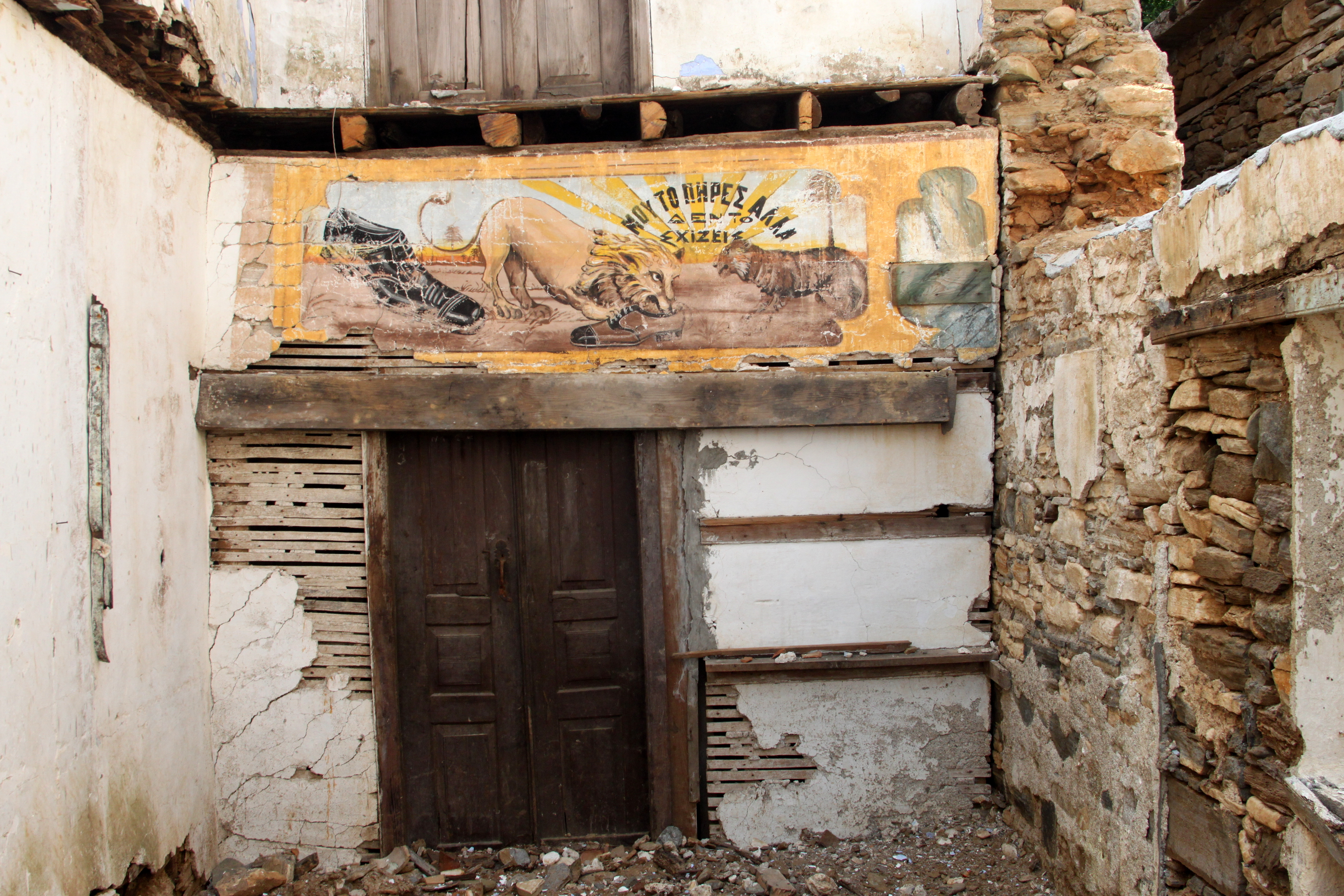
Old shoe shop with painted advertising of footwear.

Early houses were typically built on a prepared stone ground layer that allowed construction of a rectangular stone perimeter for external walls with openings for doors and windows. For a dual-level home the lower and upper levels were segmented using parallel beams the width of the house covered with boards to establish the lower level ceiling and the upper level floor. To partition rooms interior wooden walls were prepared and covered with narrow horizontal wooden strips and then in plaster. The window opening had ledges prepared from lightweight materials such as boards coated with plaster, then dressed with wooden panels with two or four folds for opening and closing. Balconies and glass were generally absent since the harsh weather from the sea and the fragile materials then available prevented these. The upper level was then finished once more using beams to form a second ceiling but instead covered with roof titles.

The lower level of early houses could serve one of several purposes including storage for produce or equipment, an animal pen, or as a shop such as cafe, goods shop, tailor shop, shoe shop, etc. The upper level served for sleeping, cooking and living space. Access to the upper level was by a staircase, which could be either external or internal.

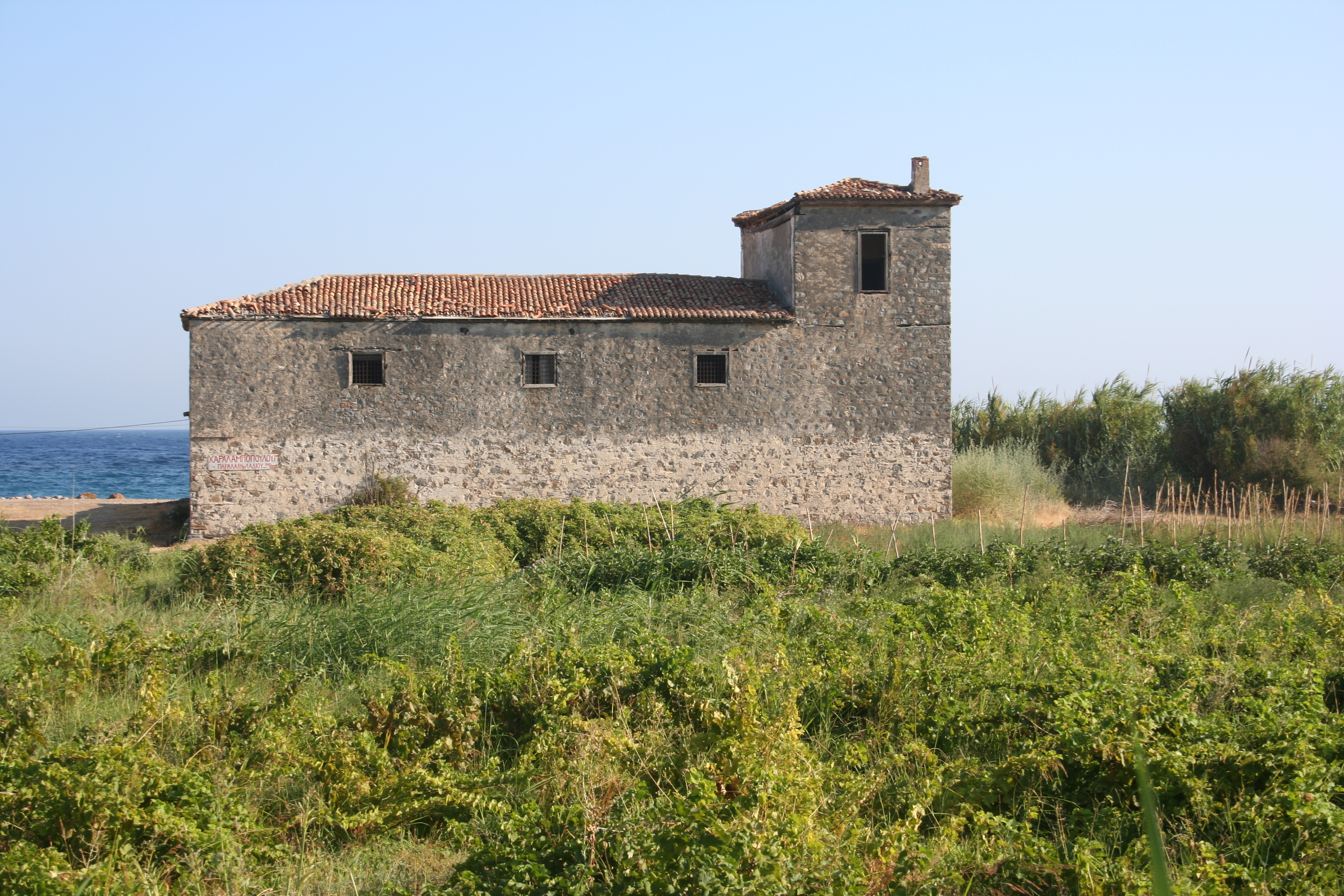
The tavern (wine warehouse) by Aristidis Folas on the eastern edge of the village.

Later homes built after the union with Greece (1912) are often found in the second row from the sea behind the beachfront homes. These are found constructed using similar methods to the beachfront homes, but some are with small central balconies and generally have a more neoclassic appearance which was popular in many Greek cities and larger towns in the interwar period, as can be seen in nearby Karlovasi. Earlier buildings were also often updated to reflect the newer styling.

Behind the beachfront row homes often found is a garden or farm plot used to provide fresh produce for the adjacent houses. This however, typically does not include grapevines since these were instead usually grown in estates outside the settlement. During periods of intensive agrarian activity small lodges called ‘Kalyvia’ outside the main settlements were often used by field workers and farmers for temporary accommodation. Closer to or within the village however are found wineries as well other light industry buildings such as olive oil mills.

== Public work – public buildings ==
Reflecting Agios Konstantinos origins as a commercial port is that it is one of the few Greek villages without a central square that helps focus the village including development. Instead cafes, and more recently taverns and bars, are established scattered along the beachfront. An enlarged space in front of the main church Agios Ioannis (Saint John) is a relatively recent inclusion. As Agios Konstantinos developed into a habitable settlement, protection from the sea was necessary and the beachfront was increasingly fortified with rocks, rubble and concrete. With time these widened and spread along the length of the beach into a functional promenade along the sea, which by 1970 joined a road accessing the forest on the eastern side of the village.

On the western end of the promenade is a substantial concrete and stone pier which was prepared for mooring fishing boats. The pier provides additional protection from the sea complementing the promenade.
