= West Samos =

West Samos Δυτική Σάμος
- Municipality
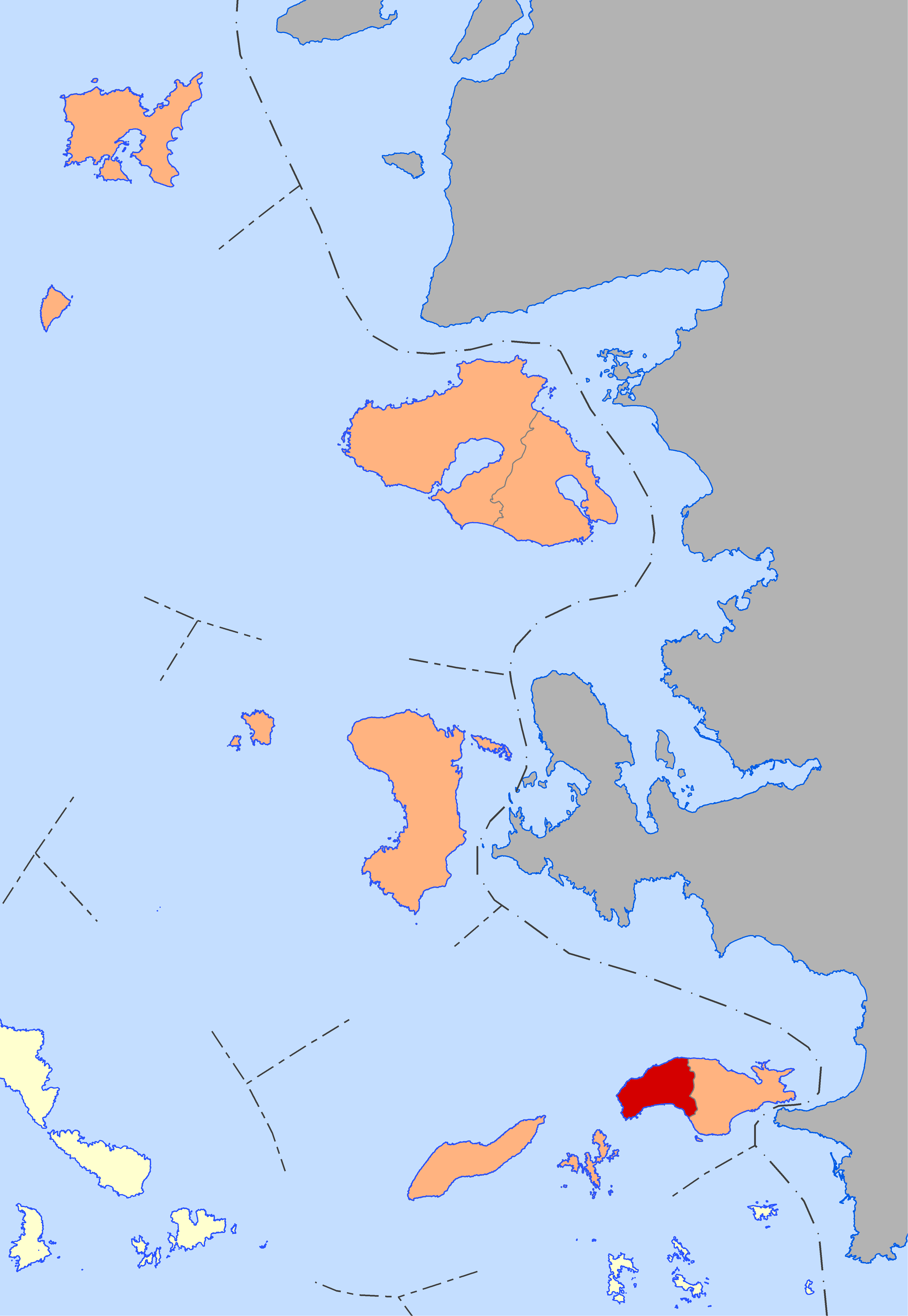

- Location within Greece
- Coordinates: 37°45′N 26°44′E
- Country: Greece
- Administrative region: North Aegean
- Regional unit: Samos
- Seat: Karlovasi

Area
  - Municipality: 187.5 km^{2} (72.4 sq mi)

Population (2021)
  - Municipality: 12,621
  - Density: 67.31/km^{2} (174.3/sq mi)
- Time zone: UTC+2 (EET)
  - Summer (DST): UTC+3 (EEST)

West Samos (Greek: Δυτική Σάμος Dytiki Samos) is a municipality on the island of Samos in the North Aegean region in Greece. The municipality was formed at the 2019 local government reform, when the pre-existing municipality of Samos was divided in two. Its seat is Karlovasi.

The municipality consists of the following two subdivisions (municipal units):

- Karlovasi
- Marathokampos
