= Karlovasi =

Town in Samos, Greece

Karlovasi Καρλόβασι
- Municipal unit
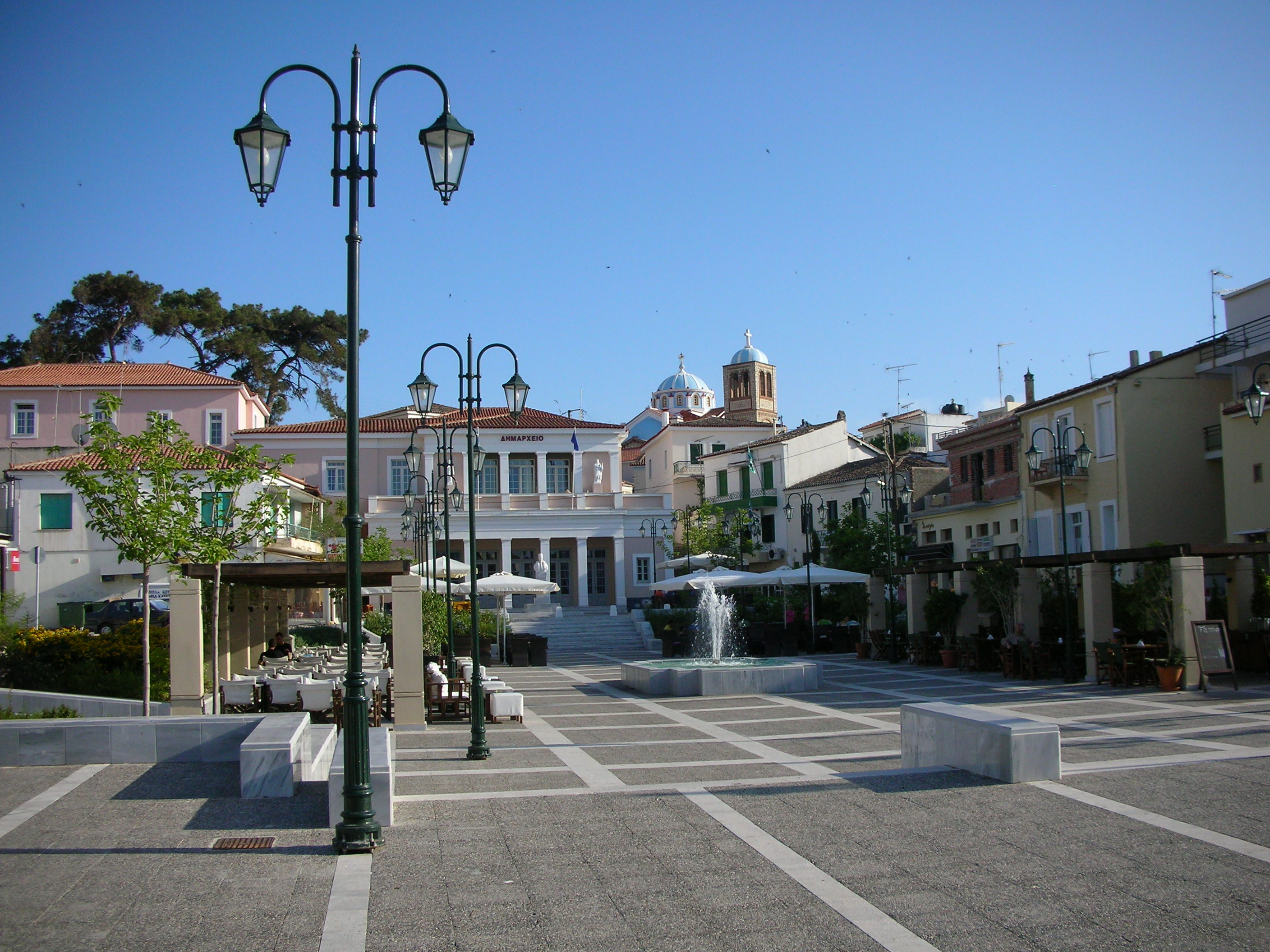
- Central square of Karlovasi.

- Location within the regional unit

- Location within Greece
- Coordinates: 37°47′N 26°42′E
- Country: Greece
- Administrative region: North Aegean
- Regional unit: Samos
- Municipality: West Samos

Area
  - Municipal unit: 100.3 km^{2} (38.7 sq mi)

Population (2021)
  - Municipal unit: 10,220
  - Municipal unit density: 101.9/km^{2} (263.9/sq mi)
  - Community: 7,363
- Time zone: UTC+2 (EET)
  - Summer (DST): UTC+3 (EEST)
- Vehicle registration: ΜΟ

Karlovasi (Greek: Καρλόβασι) is a town, a municipal unit, and a former municipality on the island of Samos, North Aegean, Greece. Since the 2019 local government reform it is part of the municipality West Samos, of which it is a municipal unit and the seat. It is located on the northwest side of the island and it is considered the commercial center of the island. According to the 2021 census, the population of the municipal unit was 10,220 inhabitants. Its land area is 100.330 km^{2}. The municipal unit shares the island of Samos with the municipal units of Vathy, Pythagoreio, and Marathokampos.

== School of Sciences of University of the Aegean ==
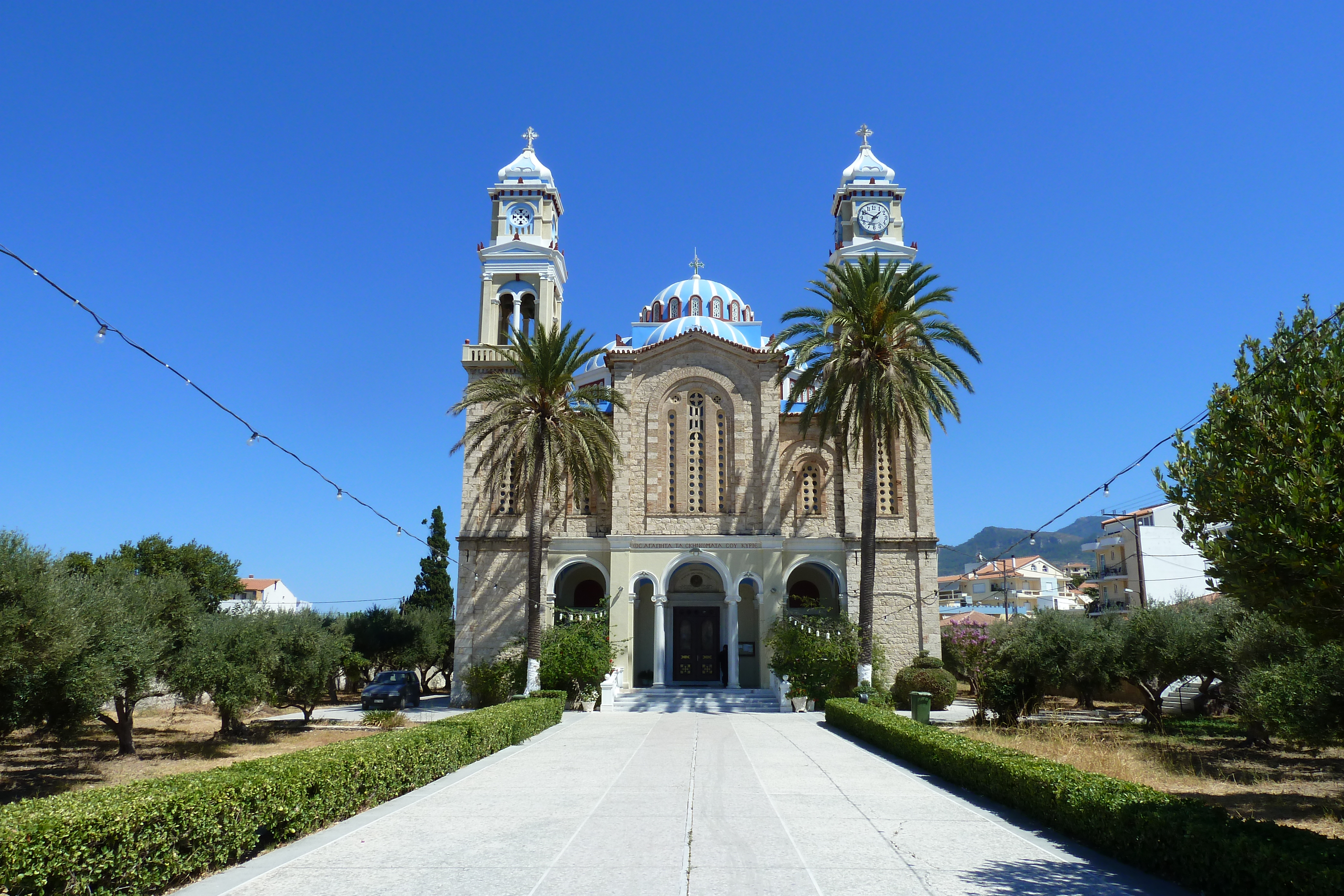
Church Agios Nikolaos

The School of Sciences of University of the Aegean is located in the town and currently there are three academic departments:

- Department of Mathematics
- Department of Information and Communication Systems Engineering
- Department of Statistics and Actuarial - Financial Mathematics

There are over 1,000 active students living in the town throughout the year.

== History ==
Karlovasi is a town with a rich cultural and industrial history, being a flourishing tannery and tobacco manufacturing center in the early 1900s. Many magnificent neoclassical mansions can be seen from that period as well as the remains of the large stone-built factories at the "Ormos" seaside. The town's economy shifted to trade after World War II and the collapse of the leather market. Pottery and brick-making became a flourishing business due to the rare quality of the soil in the environs of Karlovasi while the town's market was continuously growing to become the largest and most important in the Island. The connection of the Karlovasi Port with Seferihisar's Sığacık, in Turkey, brings a large number of travelers in the island.

Lykourgos Logothetis, the island's leader during the Greek War of Independence was born here in 1772. Karlovasi is also closely linked to Yiannis Ritsos, one of the country's most prominent poets, who spend most of his summers in his Karlovasi house, now the residence of his daughter, author Eri Ritsou.

An earthquake with a moment magnitude of 7.0 occurred on 30 October 2020, about 14 km (8.7 mi) northeast of the Greek island of Samos. Many buildings at the town of Karlovasi were collapsed or damaged as the result of this event, which is known as the "Samos earthquake" by the International Seismological Centre.

== Attractions ==
Karlovasi has an unusually large number of almost cathedral-size churches, due to the fact that the modern town was formed by the unification of four smaller ones, all of them hometowns of wealthy patrons such as tannery moguls and ship owners. The main touristic sights are the Tannery Museum, the Folklore Museum, the church of Agia Triada at Paleo Karlovasi, the 11th century church of Metamorfosis and the adjoining Venetian castle at Potami. The waterfalls of Potami and the nearby beaches of Mikro and Megalo Seitani are among the islands most popular attractions.

== Communities ==
The municipal unit contains ten communities (κοινότητες, koinótites).

Community	Community (Greek)	Pop. 2021	Area (km^{2})
Karlovasi	Καρλοβασι	7,363	21.36
Agioi Theodoroi	Άγιοι Θεόδωροι	93	2.95
Drakaioi	Δρακαίοι	75	10.18
Kastania	Καστανιά	130	6.12
Kontaiika	Κονταίικα	292	6.91
Kontakaiika	Κοντακαίικα	1,076	8.33
Kosmadaioi	Κοσμαδαίοι	72	13.30
Leka	Λέκα	424	5.80
Platanos	Πλάτανος	340	11.61
Ydroussa	Υδρούσσα	355	14.09
