= Marathokampos =

Town in Samos, Greece

Marathokampos Μαραθόκαμπος
- Municipal unit
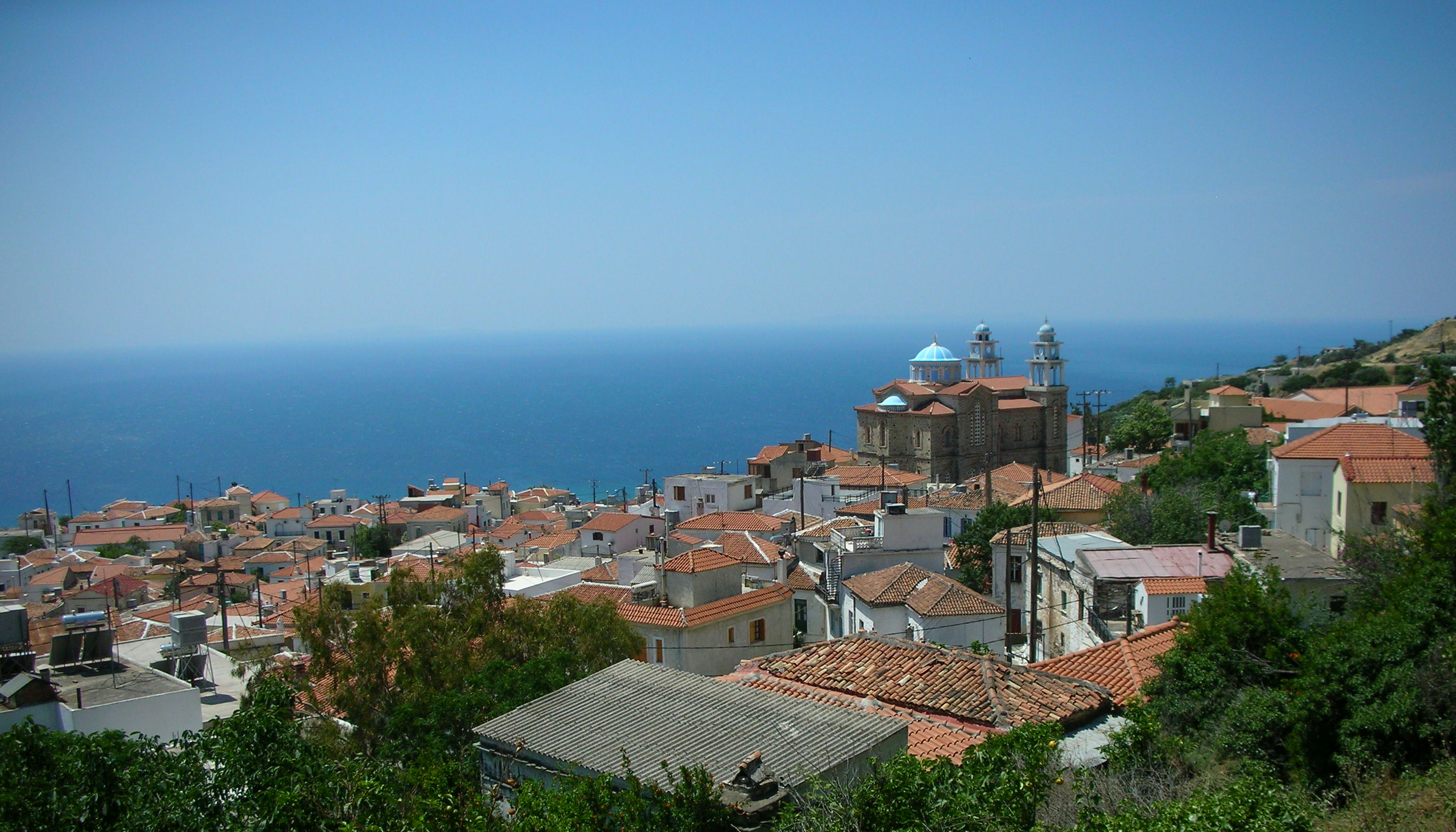
- View of Marathokampos.

- Location within the regional unit

- Location within Greece
- Coordinates: 37°44′N 26°41′E
- Country: Greece
- Administrative region: North Aegean
- Regional unit: Samos
- Municipality: West Samos

Area
  - Municipal unit: 87.3 km^{2} (33.7 sq mi)

Population (2021)
  - Municipal unit: 2,401
  - Municipal unit density: 27.5/km^{2} (71.2/sq mi)
  - Community: 1,690
- Time zone: UTC+2 (EET)
  - Summer (DST): UTC+3 (EEST)
- Vehicle registration: ΜΟ

Marathokampos (Greek: Μαραθόκαμπος) is a town, municipal unit, and a former municipality on the island of Samos, North Aegean, Greece. Since the 2019 local government reform it is part of the municipality West Samos, of which it is a municipal unit. The population is 2,401 (2021 census) and the land area is 87.250 km^{2}. It shares the island of Samos with the municipal units of Vathy, Pythagoreio, and Karlovasi. It is the smallest of the four in both land area and population.

== Communities ==
The municipal unit contains five communities (κοινότητες, koinótites).

Community	Community (Greek)	Pop. 2021	Area (km^{2})
Marathokampos	Μαραθόκαμπος	1,690	47.90
Kallithea	Καλλιθέα	143	17.52
Koumaiika	Κουμαιίκα	323	8.78
Neochori	Νεοχωρί	52	6.48
Skouraiika	Σκουραιίκα	193	6.20
