= Thermae (disambiguation) =

Thermae may refer to:

- Thermae, the building that housed ancient Roman public baths
- Thermae (Icaria), a town of ancient Icaria, Greece
- Termini Imerese, Thermae Himerenses or Thermae Himeraeae, in ancient Sicily
- Thermae Bath Spa, a modern spa built next to the Roman Baths in Bath, England
- Thermae Selinuntiae or Thermae Selinuntinae, was the classical name of Sciacca in ancient Sicily
- Thermae Romae, a Japanese manga and feature film
