= Ikaria =

Greek island in the Aegean Sea

Ikaria Ικαρία
- Municipality
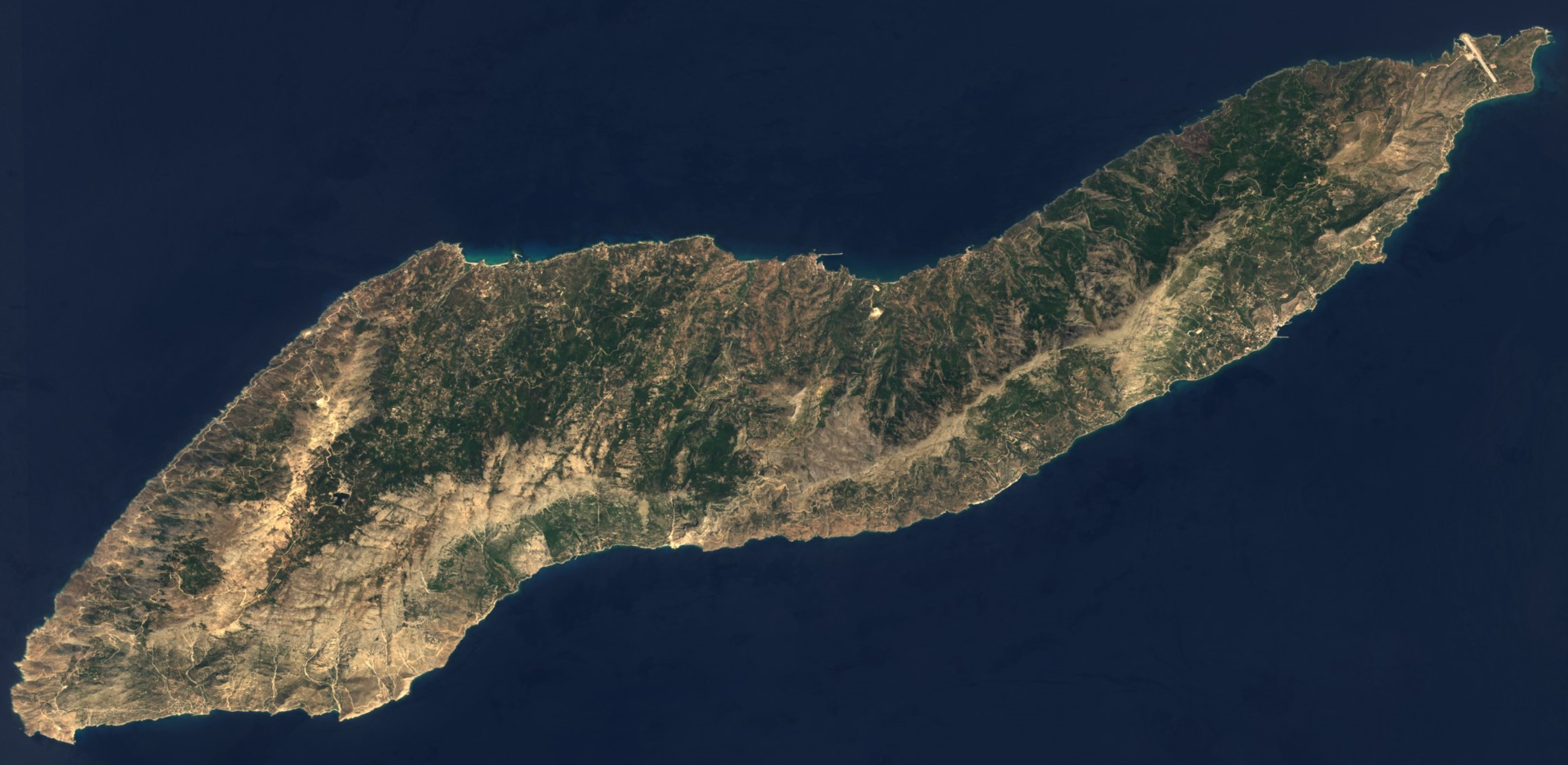
- Satellite photograph of Ikaria

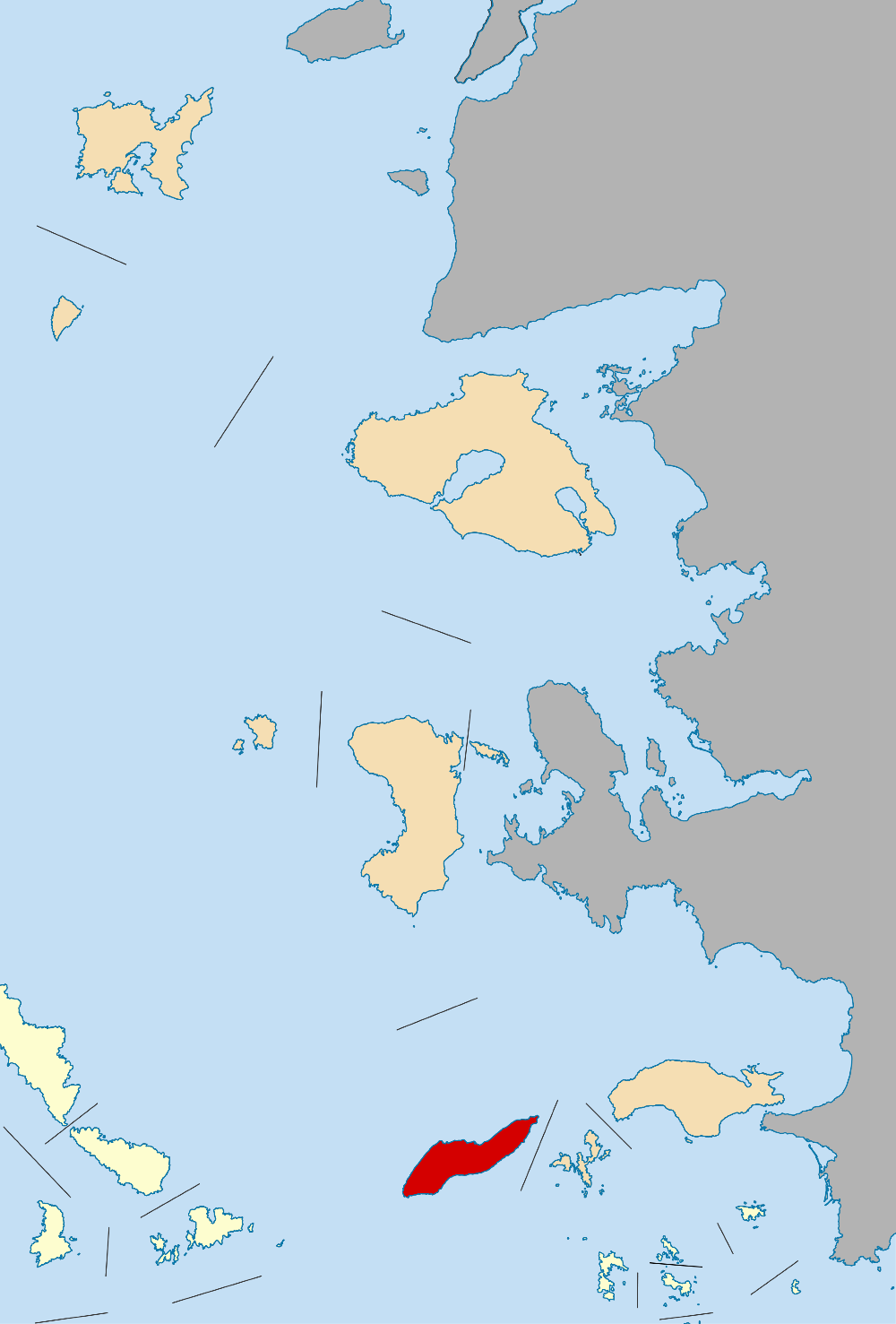

- Location within Greece
- Coordinates: 37°35′N 26°10′E
- Country: Greece
- Administrative region: North Aegean
- Regional unit: Ikaria
- Seat: Agios Kirykos

Government
  - Mayor: Fanourios Karoutsos (KKE)

Area
  - Municipality: 255.3 km^{2} (98.6 sq mi)
- Highest elevation: 1,037 m (3,402 ft)
- Lowest elevation: 0 m (0 ft)

Population (2021)
  - Municipality: 8,843
  - Density: 34.64/km^{2} (89.71/sq mi)
- Demonym: Ikarian
- Time zone: UTC+2 (EET)
  - Summer (DST): UTC+3 (EEST)
- Postal code: 833 xx
- Area code: 22750
- Vehicle registration: MO

Ikaria, also spelled Icaria (/aɪˈkɛəriə/; Greek: Ικαρία [ikaˈri.a]), is a Greek island in the Aegean Sea, 10 nautical miles (19 km) southwest of Samos. Administratively, Ikaria forms a separate municipality within the Ikaria regional unit, which is part of the North Aegean administrative region.

According to tradition, it derives its name from Icarus, the son of Daedalus in Greek mythology, who was believed to have fallen into the sea nearby and to have been buried on the island.

== Geography and topography ==
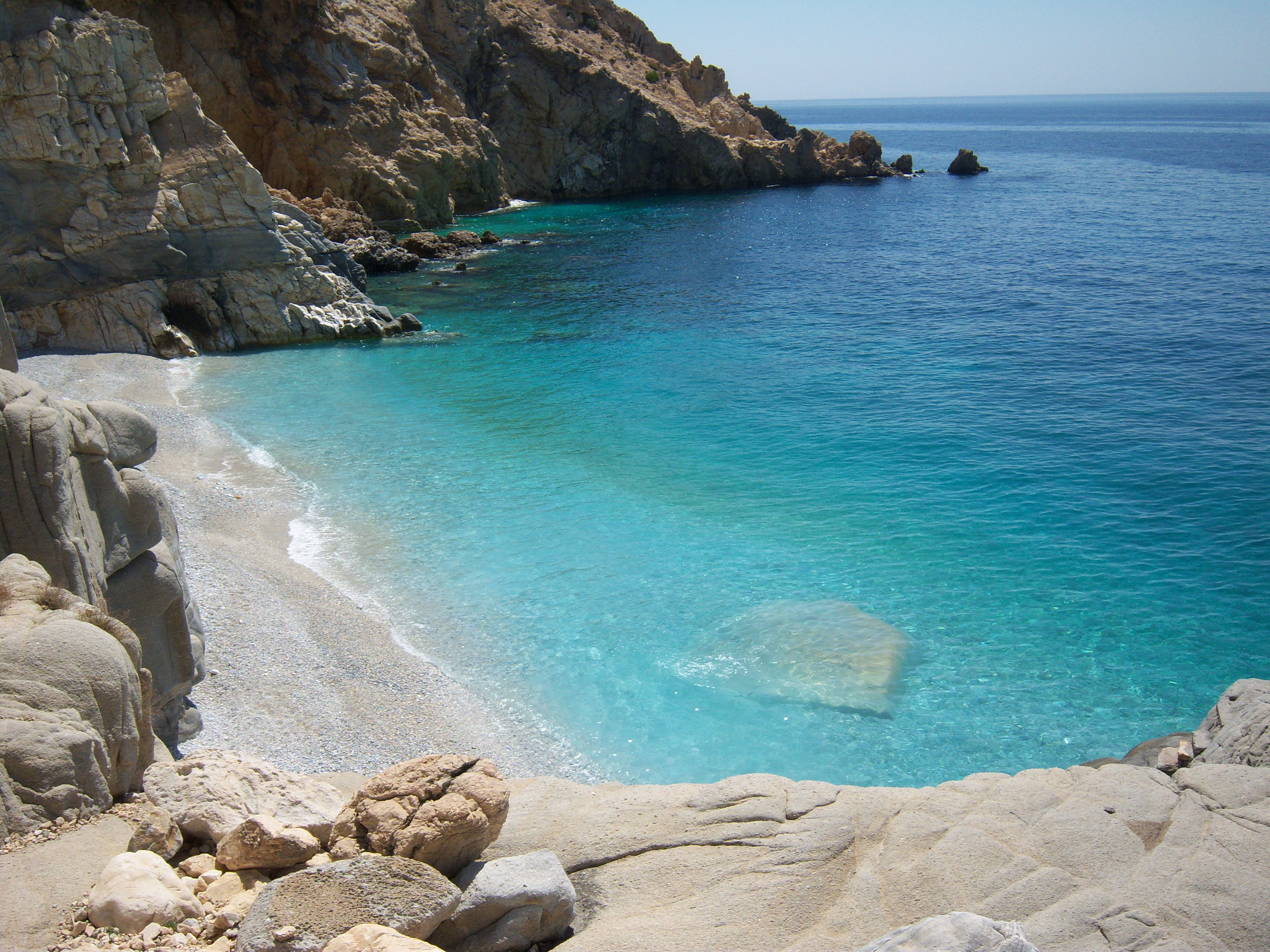
Seychelles beach, on the south side, near Magganitis. The beach is not natural, but was created by accident in the 1960s, as a result of roadworks on a tunnel on the cliff above causing rocks to fall and eventually erode into pebbles.

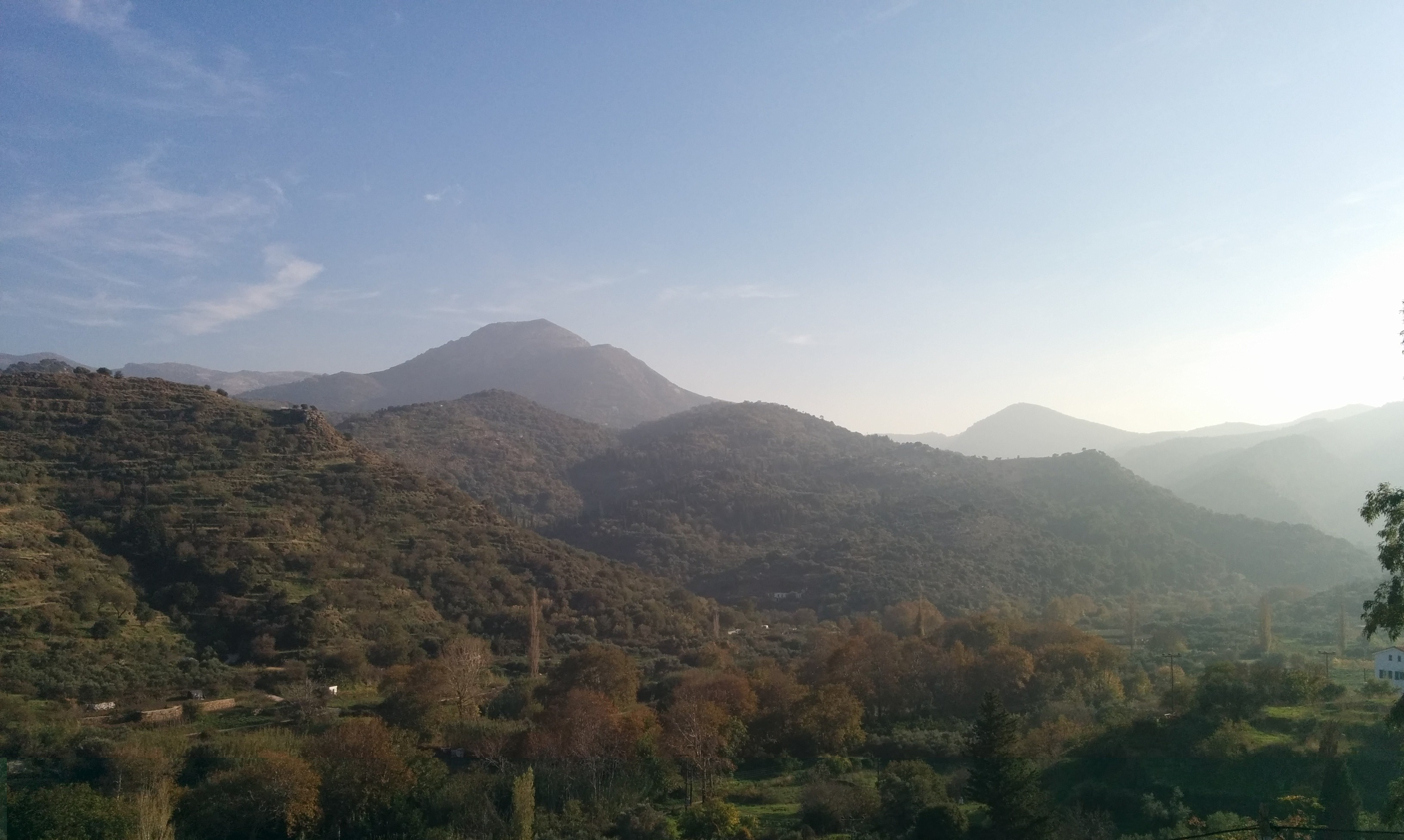
View of mountain range from Kampos, in the Mesaria region

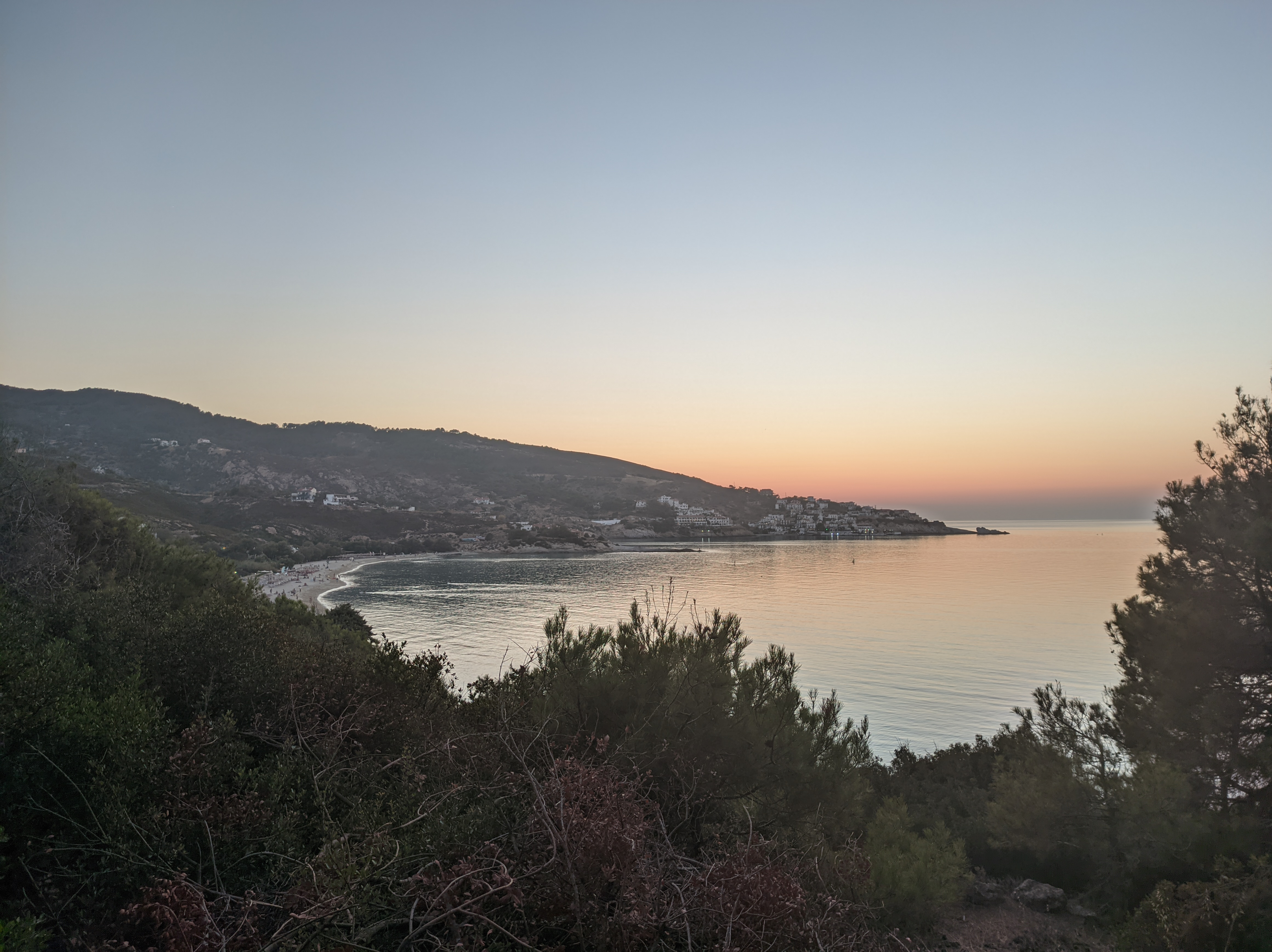
Mesakti beach, on the north coast; the village of Armenistis is in the distance.

Ikaria is one of the middle islands of the eastern (and northern) Aegean Sea, 255.303 square kilometres (98.573 sq mi) in area with 102 miles (164 kilometres) of coastline and a population of 8,312 inhabitants (2021). It is bounded by Samos to its east, Fournoi to its southeast, Chios and the Anatolian mainland to the north and the Cyclades islands to its west and far south.

The topography contrasts between verdant slopes and barren steep rocks. The island is mountainous for the most part. The entire island is crossed east-west by the Aitheras (Αιθέρας) mountain range, whose highest summit stands at 1,037 metres (3,402 feet) and splits the island between north and south. The north side tends to be greener and more fertile, predominantly hilly and increasingly mountainous towards the south, with large forests of mainly Aleppo pine and oak, with very few olive trees. The south tends to be rockier, drier and with harsher terrain, with steep cliffs towering several hundred meters above the sea. The central part of the island, called Mesaria by the locals (roughly the same area covered by Evdilos prefecture), is its most fertile area and the ancient centre of the island. To the west of it lies the Raches region and its villages, the island's most popular region amongst visitors for its traditional settlements and cultural events.

Ikaria exhibits a typical Mediterranean climate (Köppen: Csa), with hot summers, wet winters and occasional accumulation of snow on the island's various peaks. Aside from domestic and domesticated species, most prevalently the free-ranging goats, there are a number of small wild animals to be found, such as martens, European otters, jumping spiders, scorpions and green toads.

Most of Ikaria's population, both of its main towns and several of its larger villages are nestled on or near the coast. The principal town of the island, main port and seat of the municipality is Agios Kirykos. Evdilos follows in importance, the historic main city of the island (and a short distance from the ancient chief town of Oenoe) containing the island's secondary port, servicing the north side. Agios Kirykos and Evdilos are the only two ports serviced by passenger ferries, making them Ikaria's main transport links to the rest of Greece.

Other important settlements include the seaside villages of Armenistis and Karavostamo on the north side and Therma, Magganitis and Karkinagri on the south side. The most important interior settlement is Christos Rachon, seat of the Raches region, followed by Akamatra, Vrakades, Kampos and others.

== Etymology ==
In antiquity, the island was called Icaria or Ikaria (Ancient Greek: Ἰκαρία) by the ancient Greeks, the same as today, as it was believed the mythical Icarus fell into the sea south of the island on his flight from Crete. The name, however, may have instead come from the Phoenician word for fish (ikor) or for sheep (kara), in either case implying an abundance of natural life. Other historical (and now unused) names in Greek are Dolichi (Δολίχη) or Dolychi (Δολύχη), Makri (Μάκρη), Ichthyoessa (Ιχθυόεσσα) and Anemoessa (Ανεμόεσσα), the first two pertaining to the island's elongated shape and the latter two to its abundance of fish and harsh winds, respectively.

== History ==
=== Prehistory and antiquity ===
Ikaria has been inhabited, according to archaeological findings in the central and eastern parts of the island, since at least 7000 BC, when it was populated by the Neolithic Pelasgians, a blanket term used by the ancient Greeks to refer to all pre-Hellenic peoples inhabiting the Greek region. Greeks from Miletus, a major Greek polis and naval power of Asia Minor, colonized Ikaria around 750 BC, establishing their settlement in the area of present-day Kampos, the fertile, comparatively low-lying region in the north-central part of the island, which later became the ancient capital city of Oenoe. Later tradition names four major cities to have sprung on the island, Oenoe, Thermae, Drakanon (now Faros) and Tauropolion (now Nas).

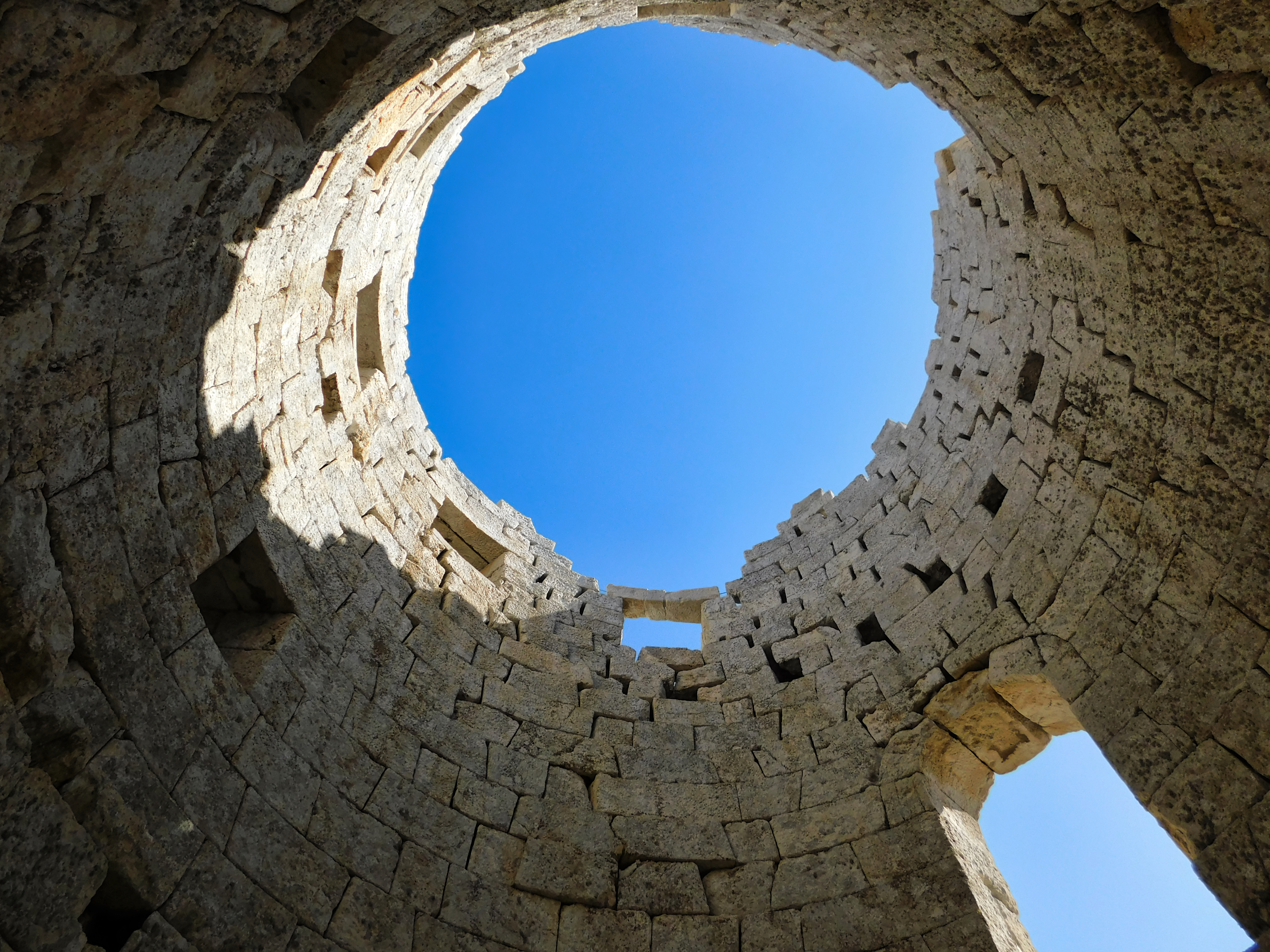
Interior of Drakanon tower, part of the phryctoria semaphore system and the only remnant of the ancient town of Drakanon. Construction of the tower dates to the Hellenistic period (4th century BC) and there were repairs during the reign of Macedonian king Demetrios I Poliorcetes (3rd century BC).

Ikaria became part of the sea empire of Polycrates, tyrant of Samos, during the 6th century BC. By the 5th century BC, the Ikarian cities of Oenoe and Thermae had become members of the Athenian-dominated Delian League. The island was again colonized by Samos in the 2nd century BC, around when the Tauropolion, the temple of Artemis, was built at Oenoe. Coins of the city represented Artemis and a bull. There was another, smaller temenos that was sacred to Artemis Tauropolos, at Nas, on the northwest coast of the island.

The seas around Ikaria, and especially to its north, had a fearsome reputation among the ancients. Homer likened its changeability to a crowd stirred by demagogy: "the gathering was stirred like the long sea-waves of the Ikarian main, which the East Wind or the South Wind has raised, rushing upon them from the clouds of father Zeus" (Iliad II, 145), and Horace, too, in the opening of his Odes associates "the African winds as they fight the Ikarian waves" with shattered ships (Odes I.i.15–6).

In the later Fabulae ("stories") of Roman writer Gaius Julius Hyginus, the Greek versions of the myth associated with Melanippe (otherwise Arne) and her sons Boeotus and Aeolus by Poseidon are amended to relate the story of Theano (otherwise Autolyte), wife of Metapontus, a king of Ikaria. Metapontus demanded that she bear him children, or leave the kingdom. She presented the exposed twin sons of Melanippe by Neptune to her husband, as if they were her own. Later Theano bore him two sons of her own and, wishing to leave the kingdom to her own children, sent them to kill Melanippe's children while out hunting. In the fight that ensued, her two sons were killed, and she committed suicide upon hearing the news. Metapontus later married Melanippe and her two sons founded towns in Propontis called by their names — Boeotia and Aeolia.

In The Anabasis of Alexander, the 2nd century AD Greek historian Arrian recorded the historian Aristobulus as saying that Alexander the Great had ordered that Failaka Island in the Persian Gulf be named Icarus, after Ikaria itself.

==== Temple of Artemis (Nas) ====
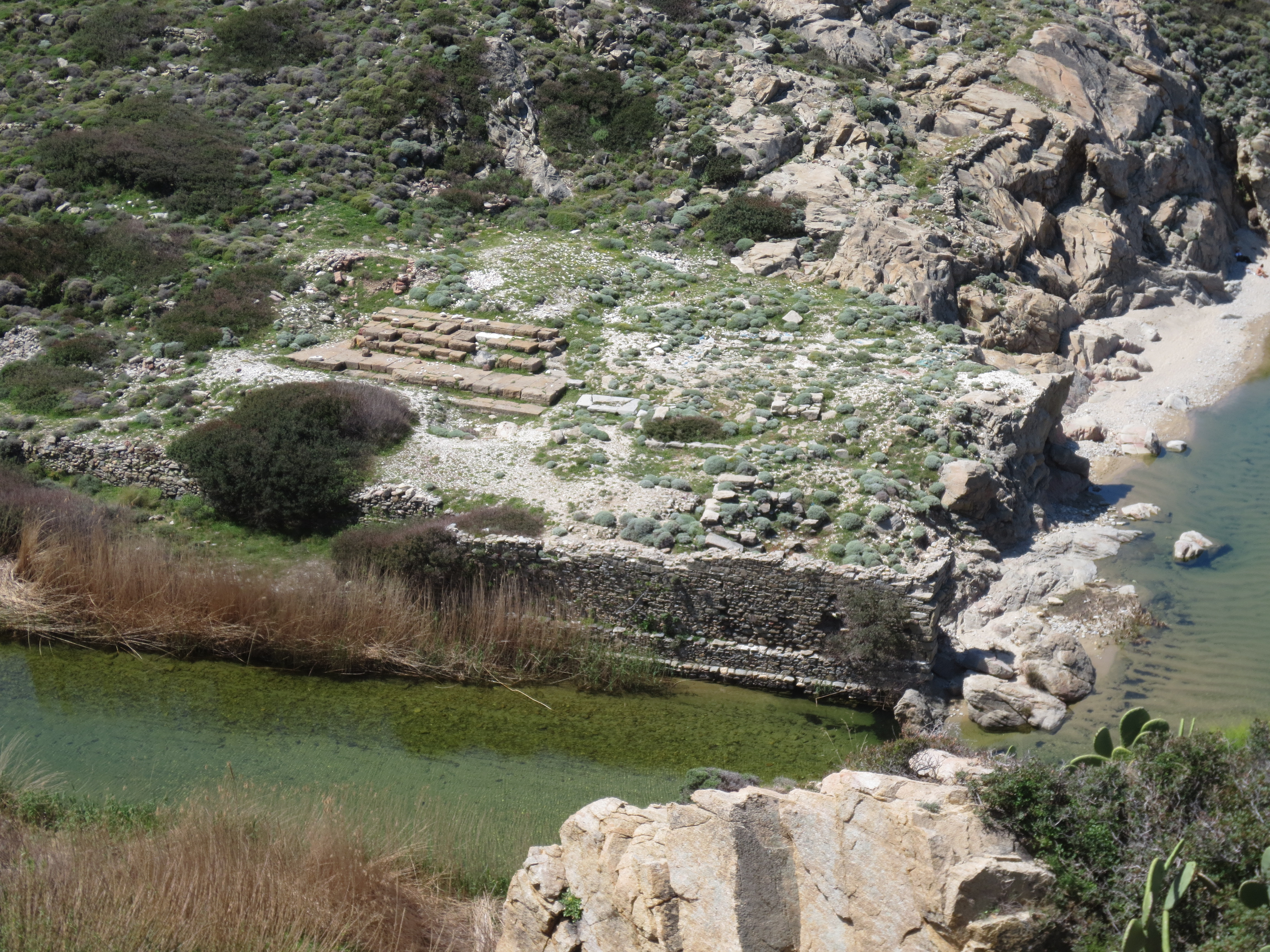
Ruins of the temple and its surrounding wall, behind the beach in Nas

The cove of Nas on the northwestern edge of the island had been a sacred spot to the pre-Hellenic inhabitants of the Aegean and an important port in antiquity, the last stop before testing the dangerous seas around Ikaria. A temple to the goddess of the hunt and the wilderness, Artemis Tauropolos, a patron of seafarers, was built on higher ground inside the cove around the 6th century BC.

The temple stood in good condition until the mid-19th century, when the marble was pillaged by local villagers to procure building materials for their local church. This church was excavated by Greek archaeologist Leon Politis in 1939. During the Axis occupation of Greece, many of the artifacts unearthed by Politis disappeared, with local tales claiming that the occupiers looted them. According to local legend, marble artefacts from the temple still lie under the sand of the Nas beach where the temple stood.

=== Medieval Era ===
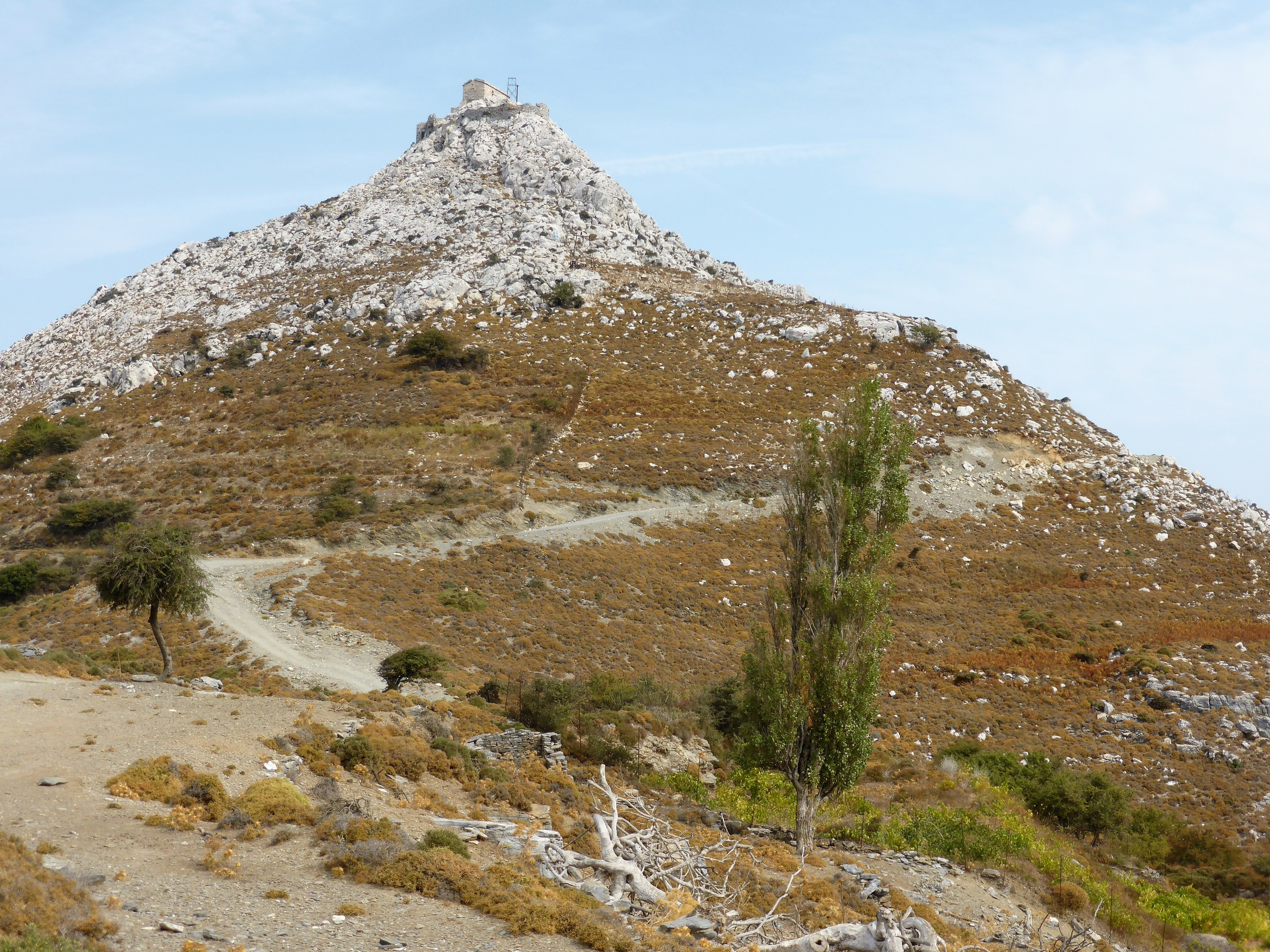
Koskinas citadel

By the early Middle Ages, with Icaria owned by the Byzantine Empire, the trend of inland habitation was starting to take shape due to the proliferation of piracy. Koskinas castle (also known as Nikaria castle or Mesaria castle) was constructed in the 10th century AD on a formidable hilltop near the village of Kossoikia, meant to hold a small garrison to guard Oenoe, by this point called Dolichi (Δολίχη, meaning 'long, slender'). The island was a common place of exile for members of the various imperial dynasties, which led to Ikarians of the time to avoid mingling with non-Ikarians, considering themselves "of noble/purple blood" (the color purple was associated with nobility in the Byzantine era). Ikaria was later taken over by the Genoese Republic in 1362, but strategically withdrew from it in 1481 in view of the Ottoman threat. It would be taken over by the Knights Hospitaller, based in Rhodes, the same year.

According to local historians, the Ikarians had built seven watchtowers along the coastlines based on their own designs. Once an unknown or enemy vessel appeared, the observers would at once light a fire at the top and head to a tank which was always filled with water. A wooden plug located at the base was pulled, and water would flow. The guards of the other watchtowers were alerted by the fire and repeated the process. In the inner side of each tower's tank were marks identical to the ones measuring volumes in flasks. Each one of these marks was labelled with a different message on it, such as "pirate attack" or "unknown ship approaching". Once the water level reached the mark signifying the appropriate message, the messengers would place the plug back on the tank and put out the fire, so that each of the other towers could decode the size and gravity of the incoming danger.

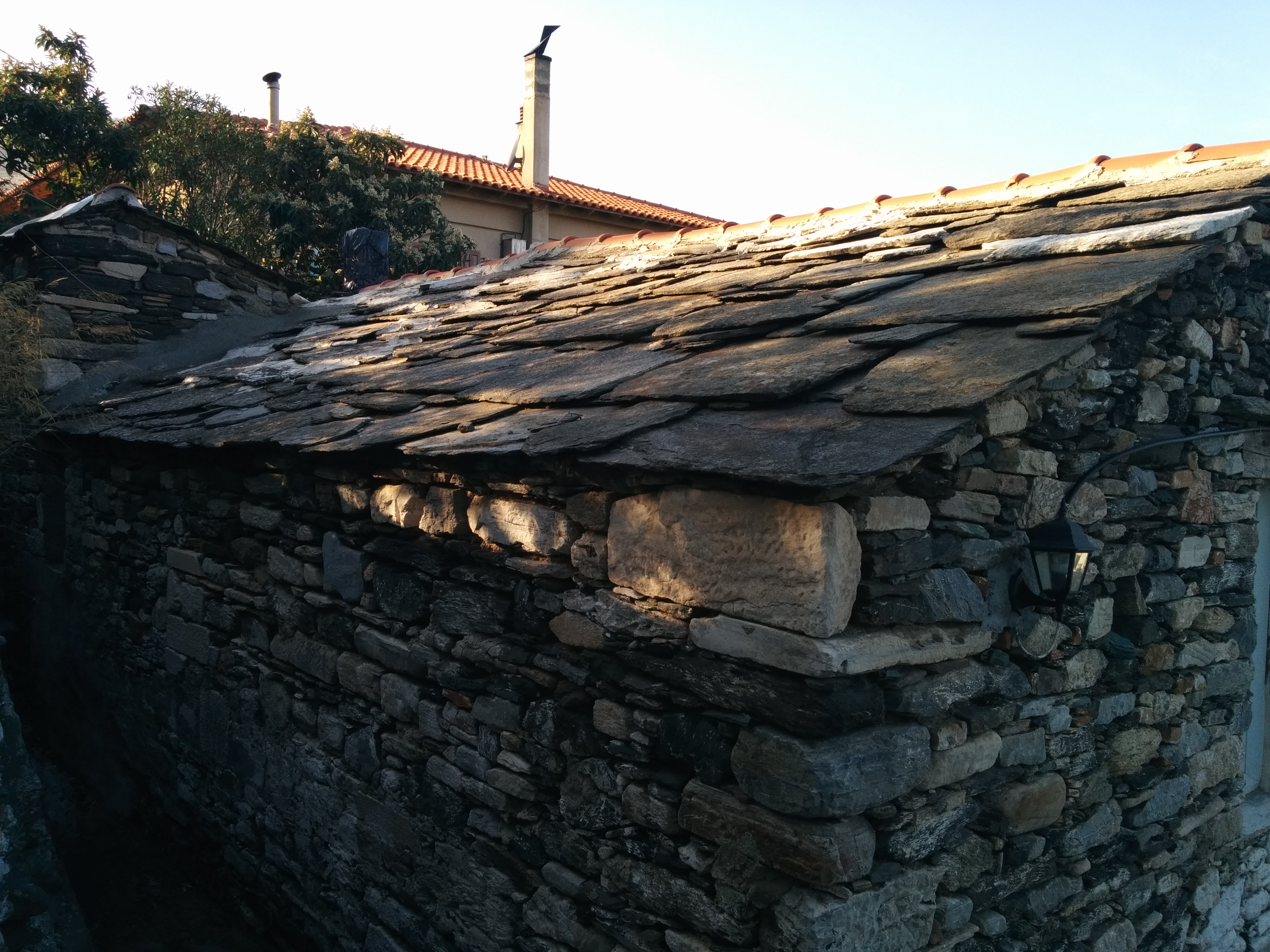
A traditional stone house; many can be found intact in the island's mountainous villages.

Traditional Ikarian architecture also surfaces around this period. Each house had a low height, a single room, a roof of stone slabs, and was distant from neighbouring ones. It had a single low door and the sea-facing side was protected with tall walls, while there was an opening on the roof (locally called the Anefantis). Because a chimney with smoke could betray the house's location, it was often sealed; fire smoke would pour through the roof slabs without being visible, while simultaneously clearing the wooden roof supports of insects. Rooms featured the bare necessities, such as a grinding stone and a cauldron. Traditionally, people would sleep on the floor and hide their belongings in the walls.

Men and women wore almost the same clothing: sewn woollen skirts for women, a type of fustanella for the men. Later on the vest came to be worn by men and women alike.

This frugal way of living contributed to the famed Ikarian longevity and the absence of distinct social classes. Despite the existence of villages, every house was its own self-sufficient entity, using the living space around it for the cultivation of all necessary things. Women contributed freely in work and social life. Villages were slowly created by descendants of an original family which gradually spread. Despite the sparse population, societal cohesion was high. There were the panigyria (traditional festivals, common across Greece, featuring dances, music and consumption of local products), team labour and elder councils who were in charge of taking important decisions. This unique way of life and architecture was preserved until the end of the 19th century, with many elements surviving until today; most famously the panigyria, which are still some of the largest of all the Aegean islands.

=== Ottoman Era ===
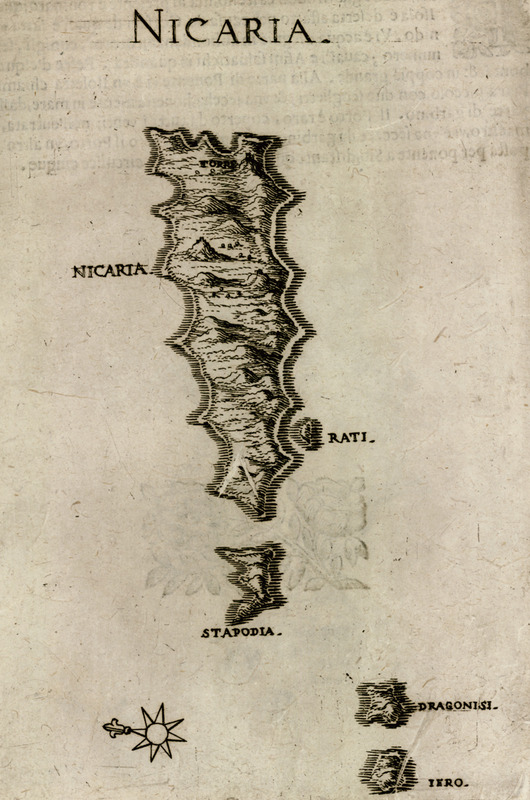
Map of (N)icaria by Marco Boschini, 1658

==== Century of Invisibility (1521–1601) ====
The Ottoman Empire seized Ikaria in 1521, conquering it from the Knights Hospitaller. It was around this time that piracy reached new heights and the islanders fully embraced the tactic of invisibility: they retreated to secure areas in the island's highlands, entirely abandoning the coastal regions, hiding their villages and homes to give any attackers the impression that the island was entirely depopulated. Self-defence also included the use of watchtowers and communal hidden supplies to be used in time of need, whose theft was punishable even by death. Locals were said to attack any unwanted visitors on their coastline, even shipwrecked sailors. This method was largely successful in protecting the island from piracy, most notably the raids of corsair Hayreddin Barbarossa. This period of extreme self-imposed isolation, also called the Century of Invisibility, started subsiding during the reign of Suleiman the Magnificent and had ended by 1601, lasting around 80 years.

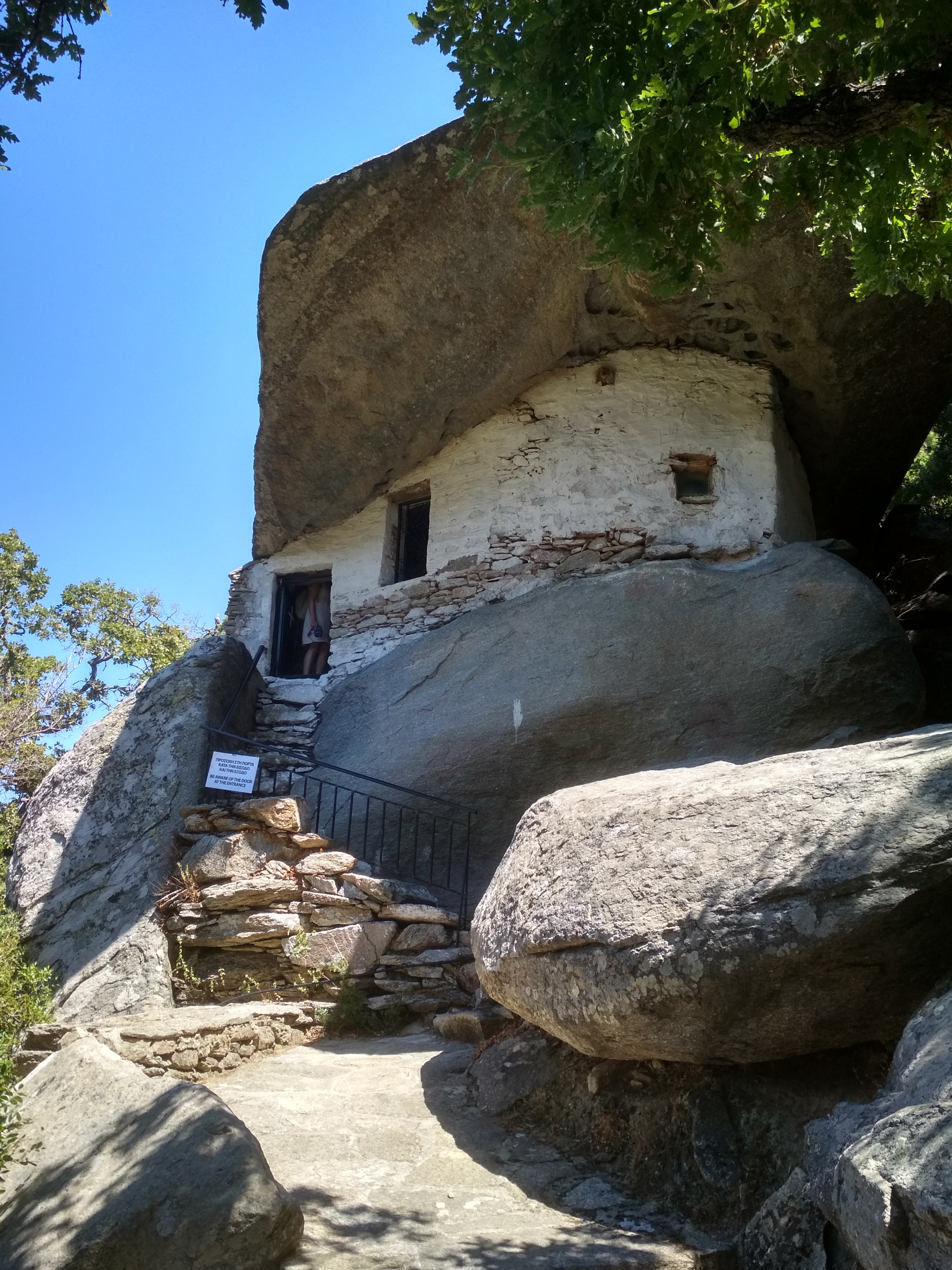
Church of St. Theoktisti of Lesvos, Pigi village. The oldest references to this church are from 1688.

The Ikarians are said to have lynched the first Ottoman tax collector who arrived to their island but managed to escape punishment. A local tale talks of an Ottoman Agha who demanded two locals to carry him on their shoulders atop a seat. The carriers, unable to accept this humiliation, threw him off a cliff in the Kako Katavasidi area, deep in the island's highlands. The Ottoman authorities rounded up the population and demanded to know who the perpetrator was, but the answer they received according to legend was "all of us, sire". The conquerors determined that there was neither profit nor honour in punishing all.

The Ottomans imposed a very loose administration, not sending any officials to Ikaria for several centuries, although from the 19th century onwards they appointed an Agha and groups of locals in each village to act as Kodjabashis in order to collect taxes for the empire. The best account available of the island during the early years of the Ottoman rule is from Joseph Georgirenes, bishop of Samos, who in 1677 described the island as having almost 1,000 hardy, long-lived inhabitants, who were the poorest people in the Aegean.

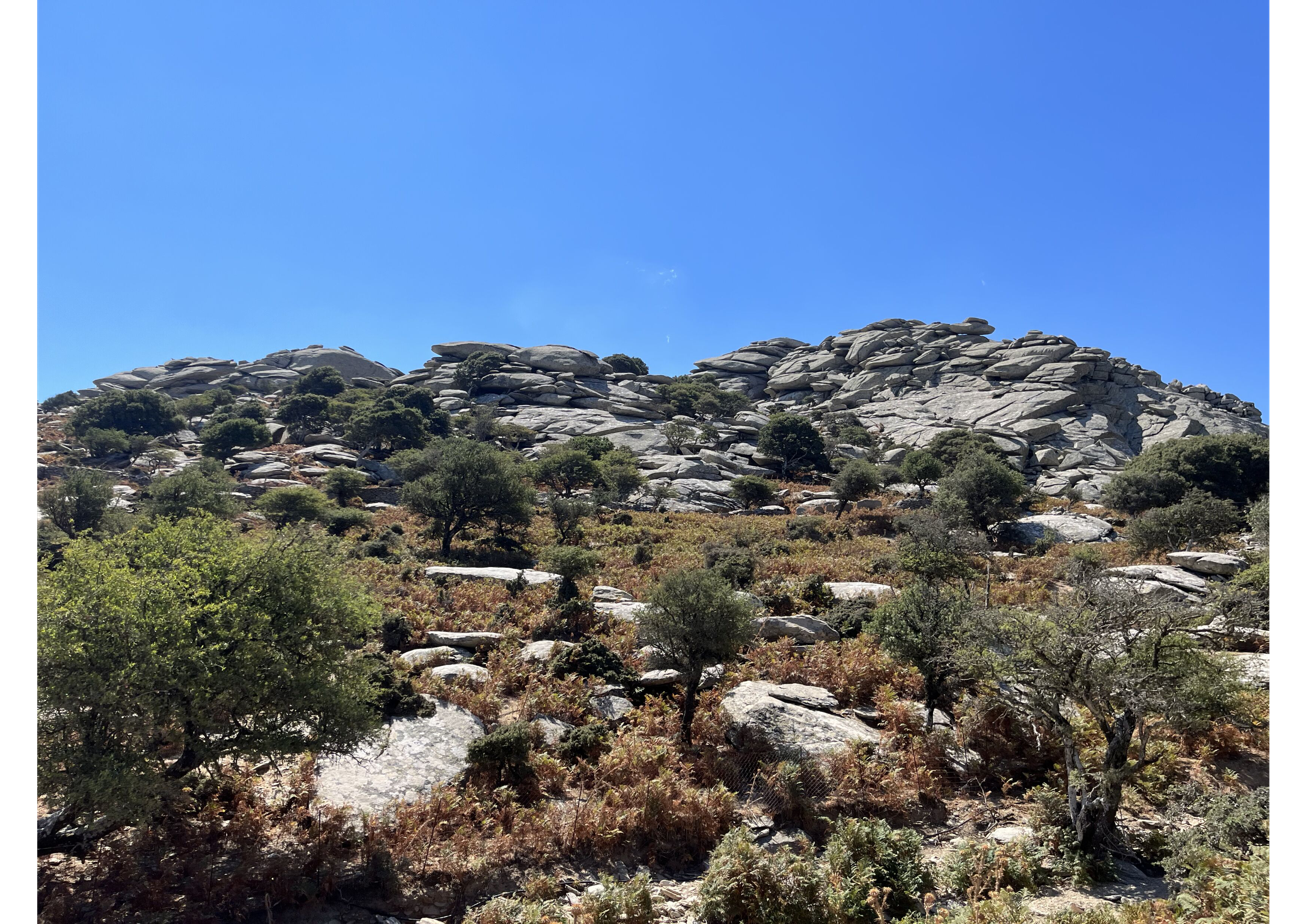
Pezi, one of the areas where the population concentrated during the Century of Invisibility

Without a decent port – most having been destroyed by the islanders themselves for protection against piracy – Ikaria depended for its very limited trade with the outside world upon small craft that were drawn up on the beaches. Ikarian boat-makers had a good reputation for building boats from the island's fir forests, selling both the boats and lumber for coin and grain in nearby Chios. The inshore waters of the island, as told by Georgirenes, provided the best cockle shellfish in the entire archipelago. Over the centuries, Ikaria would also become renowned for its charcoal, which became known as Carbon Cariot (Ikarian Charcoal). Ikaria in the 17th century was unusual in the archipelago in not producing any wine for export, the locals keeping barrels of the strong red wine for themselves. They also continued to store it in the way prevalent since the Bronze Age, in terracotta pithoi containers sunk to their rims in earth, thus protecting their supplies from both tax collectors and pirates. Flocks of goats and sheep, even those belonging to shepherds, ranged free and virtually untended in the rocky highlands, much like today. Cheese was made for consumption in every household.

Georgirenes records three small towns, none of which exceeded 100 houses (Cachoria, Steli and Musara), and numerous villages, where each house had a walled orchard and a garden plot. Unlike the closely built towns of Samos, the hardy inhabitants lived separately in fortified, unfurnished farmsteads.

=== Free State of Icaria (1912) ===
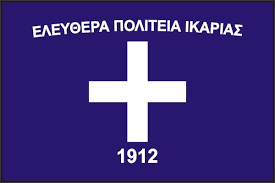
Flag of the Free State of Ikaria with commemorative writing and date. This flag (and, more rarely, a textless variation) can often be seen flown or hung by locals across the island as a display of regionalist sentiment.

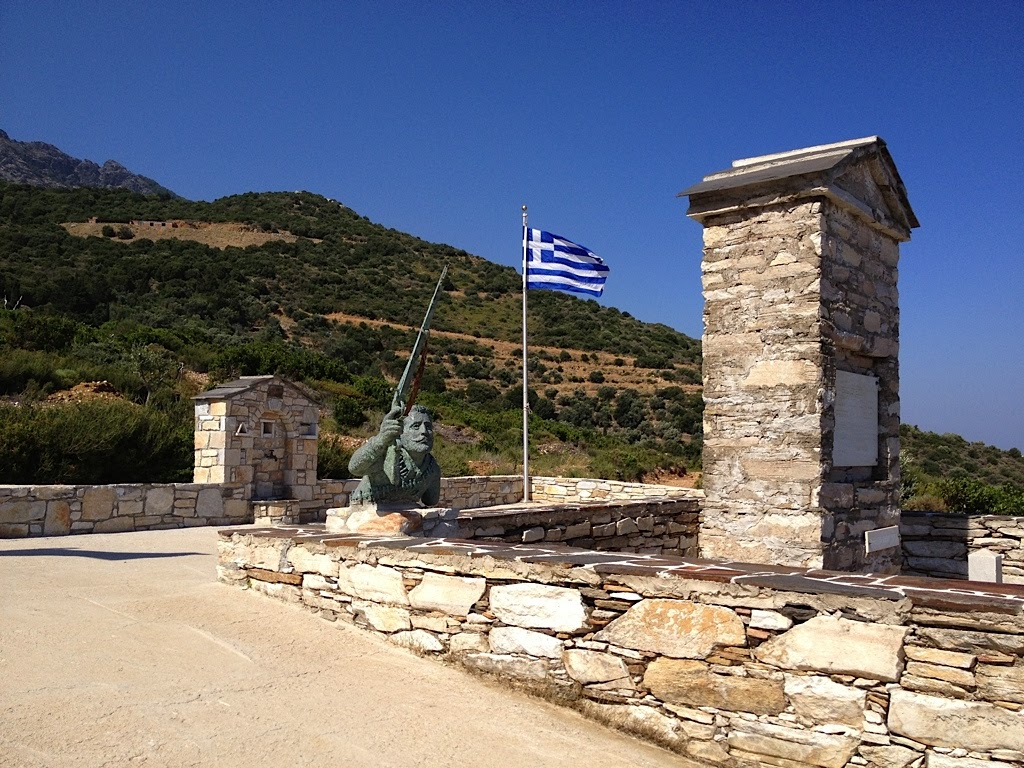
Memorial in honor of George N. Spanos in Chrysostomos

Ikaria broke away from the Ottoman Empire in 1827, during the Greek War of Independence, but was not included in the territory of newly independent Greece, forced to accept Ottoman rule once more a few years later.

Ikaria remained part of the Ottoman Empire until 17 July 1912, when the locals rose and expelled the Turkish garrison from the island. George N. Spanos (c. 1872–1912) of Evdilos, the sole Ikarian killed in the fighting, during a battle on 17 July 1912, is locally honoured as the hero of the uprising. His bust, depicting him defiantly, with bandoliers on his body and rifle in hand, may be seen at the memorial established in his honour at the site of his death, in the town of Chrysostomos.

The Free State of Ikaria (Ελευθέρα Πολιτεία Ικαρίας, Elefthéra Politía Ikarías) was declared on 18 July 1912. The neighboring islands of Fournoi Korseon were also incorporated in the Free State. Doctor Ioannis Malachias (Ιωάννης Μαλαχίας) was the first and only president of the Free State. After the outbreak of the First Balkan War in October 1912, Ikaria's sole "warship", the Cleopatra, was used to provide food and supplies to the islands of Samos and Chios, captured by the Greek Navy in the war's Aegean campaign.

Ikaria remained an independent country for five months, with its own government, armed forces, national flag, coat of arms, postage stamps, and national anthem. These five months were difficult for the island's economy, with food shortages and the risk of being annexed into the Italian Dodecanese. On 4 November 1912, after a delay due to the Balkan Wars, Ikaria officially became part of the Kingdom of Greece. The Ottoman Empire recognized Greece's annexation of Ikaria and the other Aegean islands in the Treaty of London (1913).

=== Second World War, Greek civil war, and exile ===
The island suffered losses in property and lives during the Second World War as the result of the Italian and then German occupation. There are no exact figures on how many people starved, but in the village of Karavostamo alone over 100 are said to have perished from starvation.

After the ravages of the war, nationalists and communists fought in the Greek Civil War (1946–1949), and the Greek government used the island to exile about 13,000 people. The island, due to its isolation and poverty, was already being used as a place of exile since the 4th of August Regime under Ioannis Metaxas, and its role only proliferated in the years of the civil war.

To this date, the majority of the locals remain sympathetic to left parties and communism, with the island often referred to as the "Red Rock" (Κόκκινος Βράχος, Kokkinos Vrahos). Left parties were always elected with 60–70% of the vote several years in a row and it is the only municipality in Greece to have elected a mayor from the Communist Party of Greece (KKE).

=== 1960s to the modern day ===
The quality of life slowly began to improve after the 1960s, when the Greek government began to invest in island infrastructure to assist in the promotion of tourism. Tourism in Icaria began to take shape in the 1970s, where domestic and foreign visitors, mostly famously of the hippie subculture, termed grouvaloi by the locals, started flocking to the island, initially as a distant safe haven from the Junta and its enforcement of social prudence, then as a place where a relaxed, carefree lifestyle in a rugged island landscape proved very attractive.

It took until the 1990s, however, for an airport in Ikaria to be built, along with other important infrastructure like the Pezi dam (built 1994), and only in the last few decades have ferry connections to other islands and the mainland been improved and regularized. Even today, the economy is heavily dependent on summer tourism, which, however, both funds and encourages important infrastructure works like main asphalt roads, hospitals and hybrid energy projects combining of hydroelectric dams and wind turbines.

The island is a tourist destination, serviced by plane and ferry travel routes.

=== Longevity ===
Ikaria is considered to be one of the world's five "blue zones", areas where the population regularly lives to an advanced age (one in three make it to their 90s and a significant percentage are centenarians and beyond). This is due to a combination of factors such as a healthy diet (small amounts of natural products like olive oil, red wine, herbal tea, fruits and vegetables, and only limited amounts of meat, sugar and dairy), lifestyle (low stress, exercise though daily activities, active social life), and genetics. The Ikaria Study, published in 2011, sought to understand the factors that contributed to longevity. The study also showed the high rate of sexual intercourse among elderly men; 80% of Ikarian males aged between 65 and 100 were found to still be having sex on a regular basis.

== Ikarian diaspora ==
The inhabitants of the island are known as Ikarians or Icariots (Greek: Ικαριότες, Ikariótes). An Ikarian diaspora is found throughout Greece, specifically on nearby Thimena and Fournoi Korseon, but also in large numbers in Athens (such as Piraeus). Diaspora also exists in Australia, the United States, Canada, Egypt and the United Kingdom.

Ikarian Greeks themselves are closely related to other Aegean islander Greeks, such as Greeks from Samos, Chios, Fournoi Korseon, and Patmos, as well as Greeks from Anatolia.

== Municipality and subdivisions ==
The present municipality Ikaria was formed in the 2011 local government reform by the merger of Agios Kirykos, Evdilos and Raches.

=== Subdivisions ===
The municipal units Agios Kirykos, Evdilos and Raches are subdivided into the following communities (constituent villages in brackets):

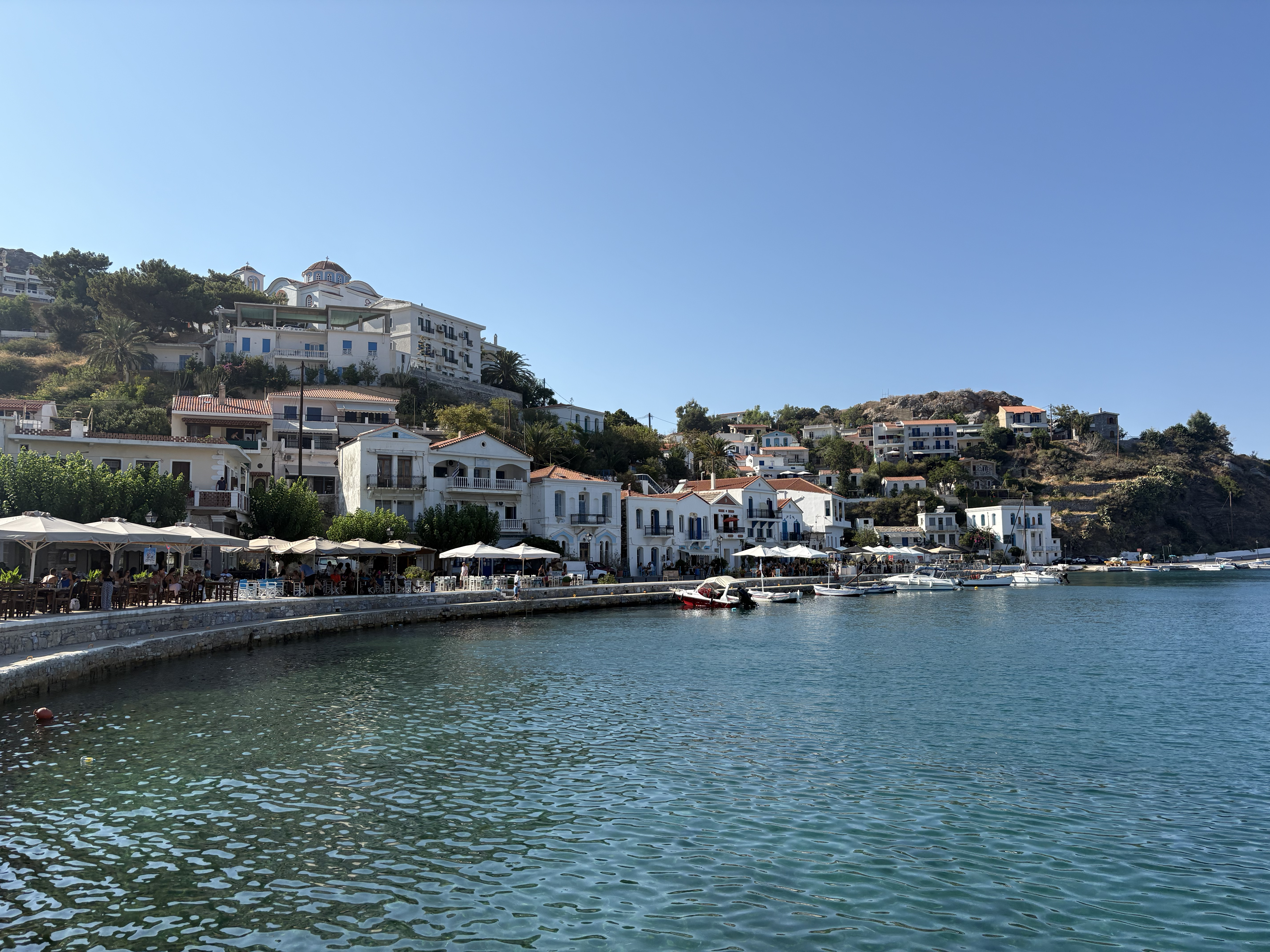
Part of Evdilos

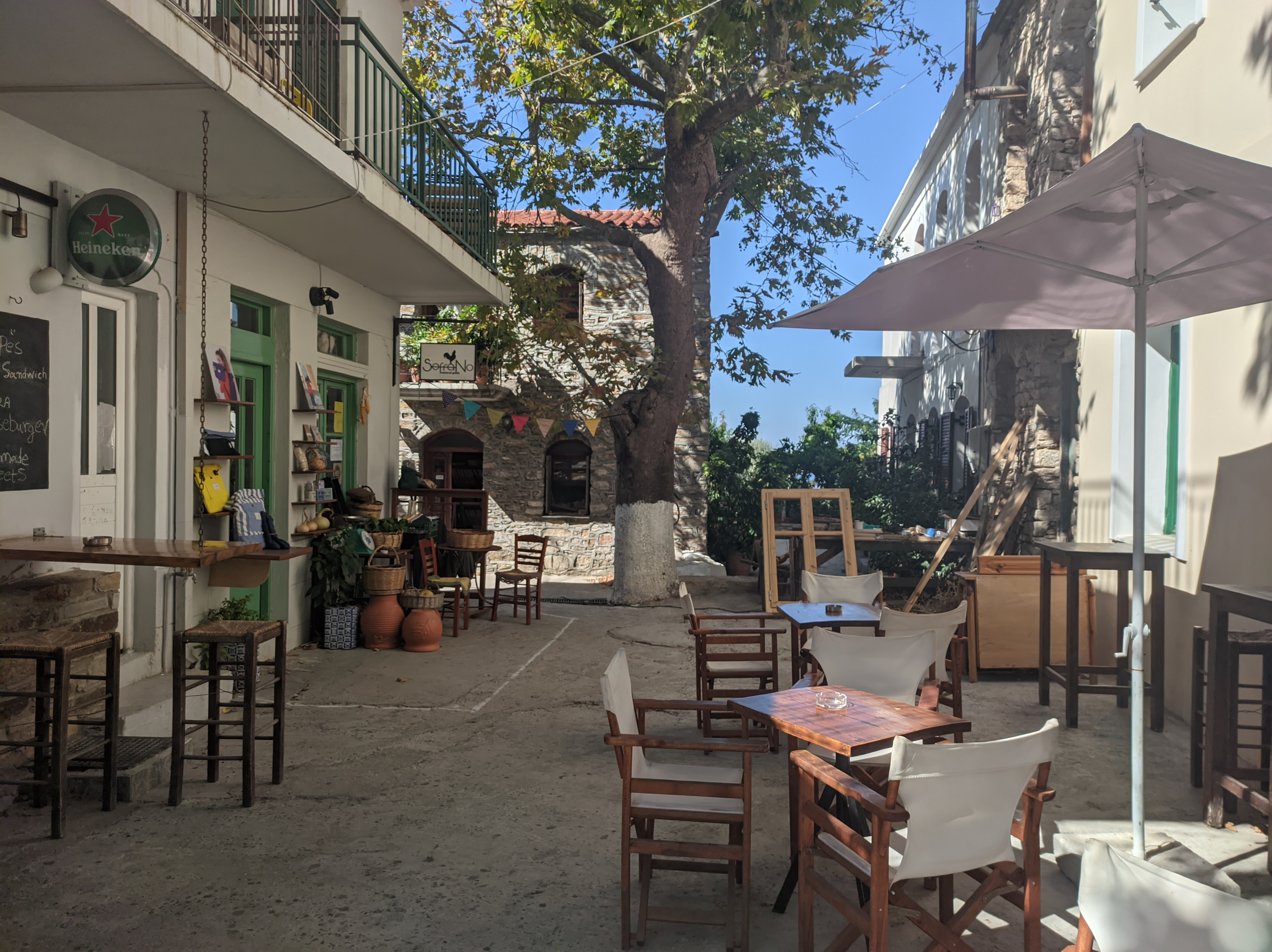
A street in Christos Rachon

Agios Kirykos

- Agios Kirykos (Agios Kirykos, Therma, Katafygio, Lardades, Mavrato, Koundouma, Mavrikato, Xylosyrtis, Oxea, Tsouredes, Faros)
- Perdiki (Perdiki, Kioni, Mileopo, Monokampi, Ploumari)
- Chrysostomos (Chrysostomos, Vardarades, Vaoni, Livadi, Plagia)

Evdilos

- Evdilos (Evdilos, Kambos, Agia Kyriaki, Droutsoulas, Kerameio, Kyparissi, Xanthi, Fytema)
- Arethousa (Arethousa, Kyparissi, Pera Arethousa, Foinikas)
- Dafni (Dafni, Akamatra, Kosoikia, Petropouli, Steli)
- Karavostamo
- Manganitis (Manganitis, Kalamonari)
- Frantato (Frantato, Avlaki, Kalamourida, Kampos, Kremasti, Maratho, Pigi, Stavlos)

Raches

- Raches (Christos, Agios Dimitrios, Armenistis, Vrakades, Kares, Nas (or Kato Raches), Kouniadoi, Mavriannos, Nanouras, Xinta, Proespera, Profitis Ilias, Tsakades)
- Agios Polykarpos (Agios Polykarpos, Agios Panteleimonas, Gialiskari, Kastanies (or Tragostasi), Lapsachades, Lomvardades, Mandria)
- Karkinagri (Karkinagri, Amalo, Kalamos, Lagkada, Pezi, Trapalo)

== Museums ==
=== Archeological Museum of Kampos ===
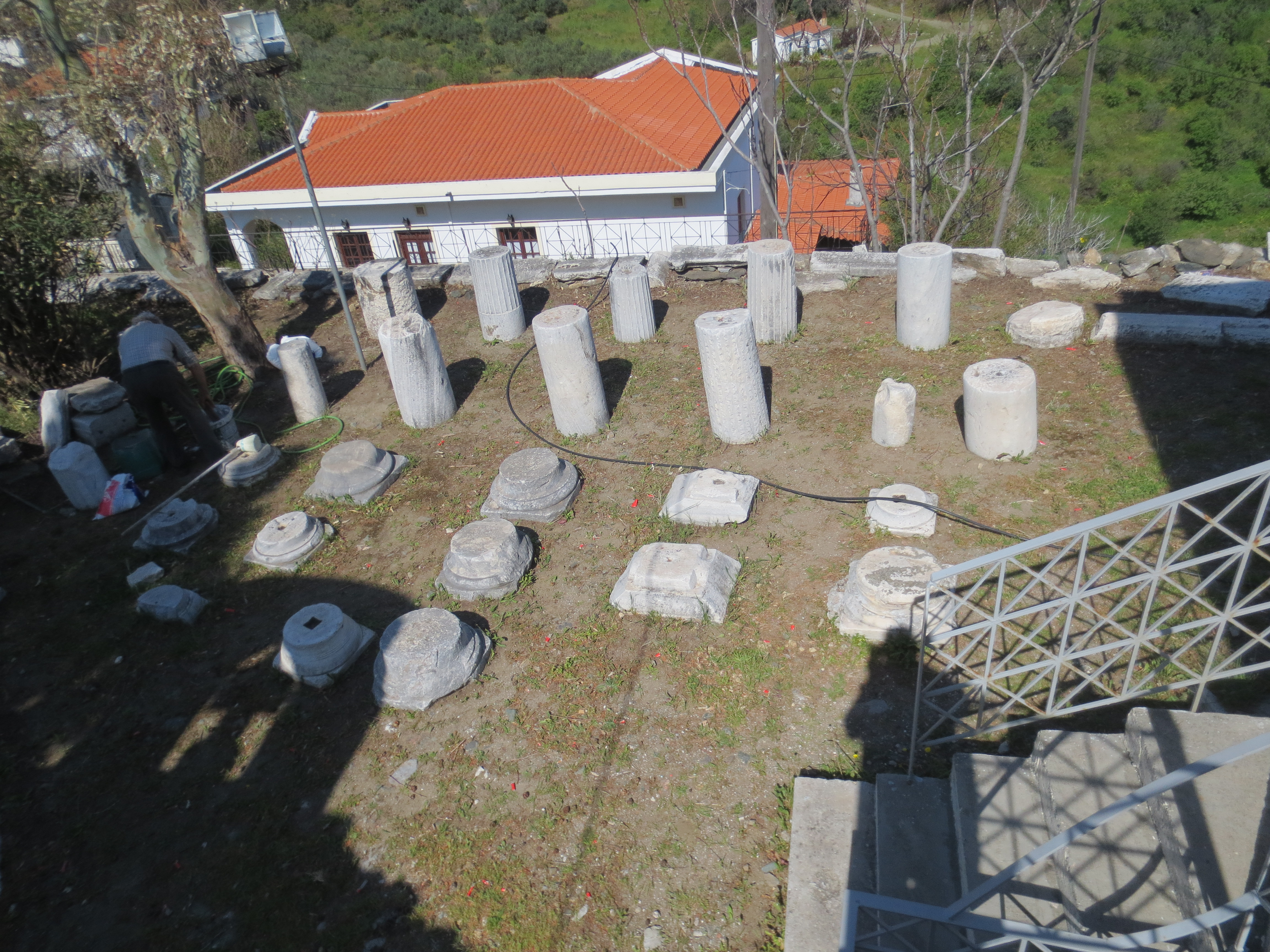
Kampos archaeological museum

The Archaeological Museum, located in the village of Kampos, stands on the hill where ancient Oenoe also stood, and is immediately next to Agia Irini, the island's oldest standing church. The museum contains over 250 artifacts, including Neolithic tools, pottery vessels, clay statuettes, columns, coins, and carved headstones.

=== Archeological Museum of Agios Kirykos ===
Housed in the former high school of Agios Kirykos, the island's capital, built by the Ikarian diaspora living in America, the recently renovated neoclassical building dating to 1925 is the home of Ikaria's Archeological Museum as of 2014. This listed building houses all of Ikaria's most relevant finds and highlights the history, cultural, commercial and social development and culture of the island, complete with multimedia displays and films.

=== Folk and Historical Museum of Agios Kirykos ===
Opened in July 2010 in Agios Kirykos as the result of the long efforts by Professor Themistocles Katsaros, its mission is to preserve and promote Ikarian folklore, traditions and customs through its display of over 1,500 objects that reflect the history and heritage of Ikaria and its inhabitants. The museum exhibits items of cultural importance from the island, including dresses, textiles, household articles, pottery, agriculture and trade tools & instruments, photos, documents and many other objects. Of particular interest amongst the items displayed in the museum is the flag of the Free State of Ikaria (1912). Some of the exhibits have been organised thematically and chronologically, so that objects and images give visitors an idea of social and economic life in Ikaria from the 18th century to the 1970s, when traditional life still continued in the region.

=== Folklore Museum Of Vrakades ===
The Folklore Museum of Vrakades is located in the scenic village of Vrakades, 650 meters above sea level on the north-western side of the island. The village was founded in the 17th century and contains old stone houses and captains' villas of architectural note. The museum houses an interesting collection of items related to the history and people of the region. Of particular interest are documents and memorabilia from the Free State of Ikaria.

Other exhibits include various clay and wooden objects used by housewives, beekeepers, and farmers, ecclesiastical relics from Profit Elias in Vrakades and the convent of Evagelistrias Mavrianou, books by Ikarian writers, Ikarian records and documents over 500 years old. Of note is the cutter, "lanari" in Greek, used for the processing of wool and goat hairs from which the modest local clothing was made, the "lisgos", a simple tool used for making ropes, an old digging tool, and many other tools belonging to the first inhabitants of the island.

== Gallery ==
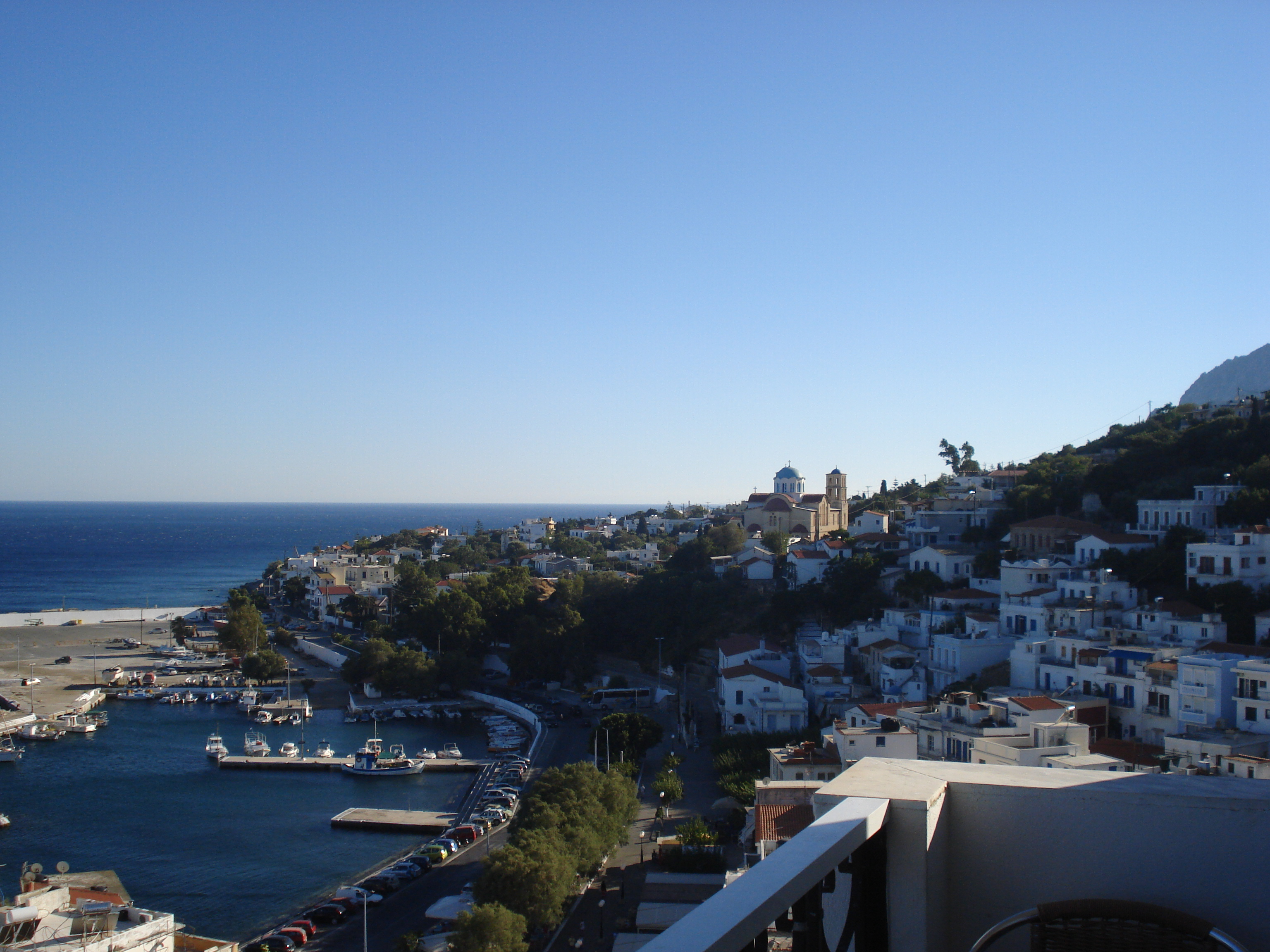
Agios Kirykos, the administrative capital

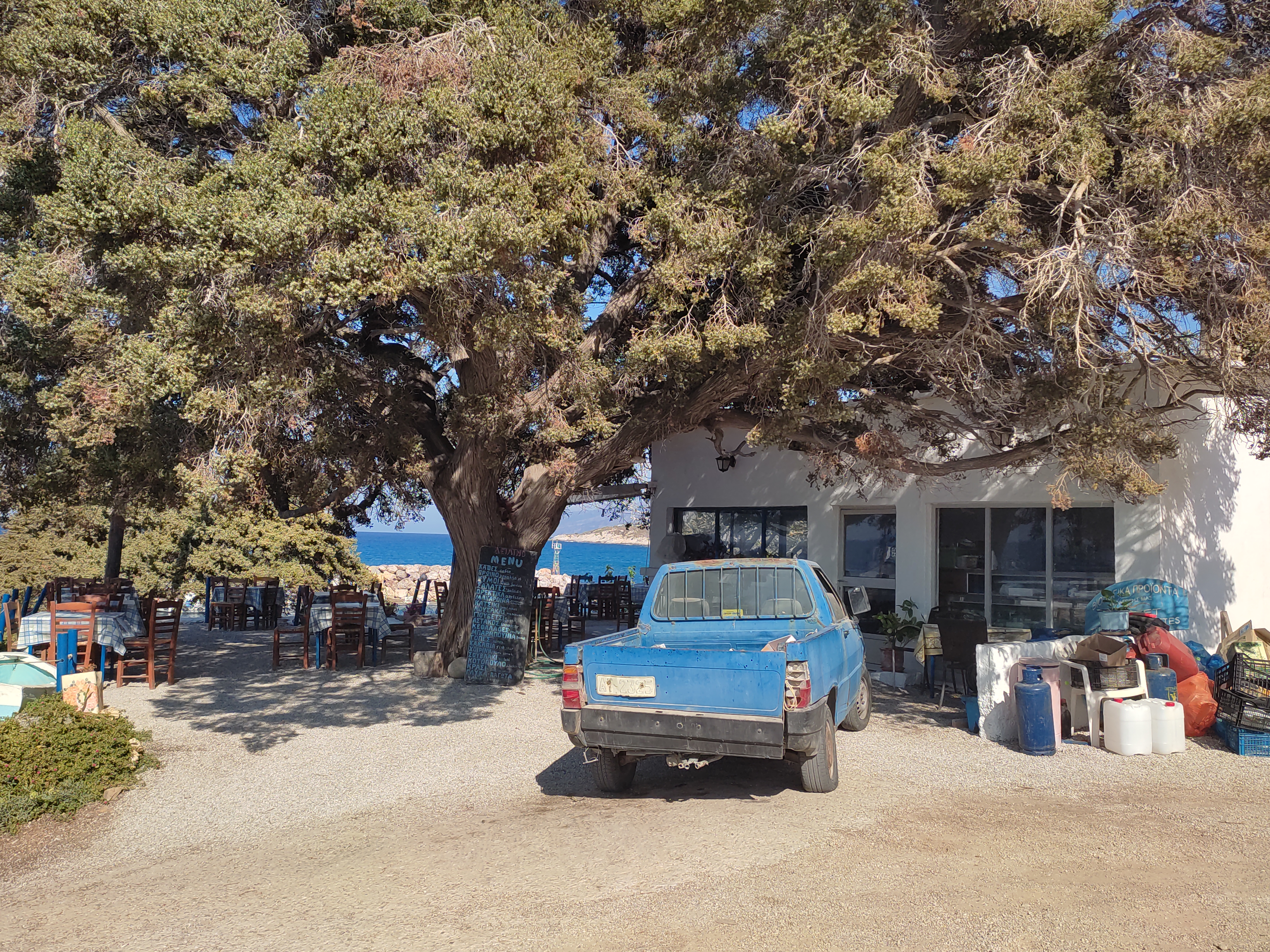
Tavern on the south side

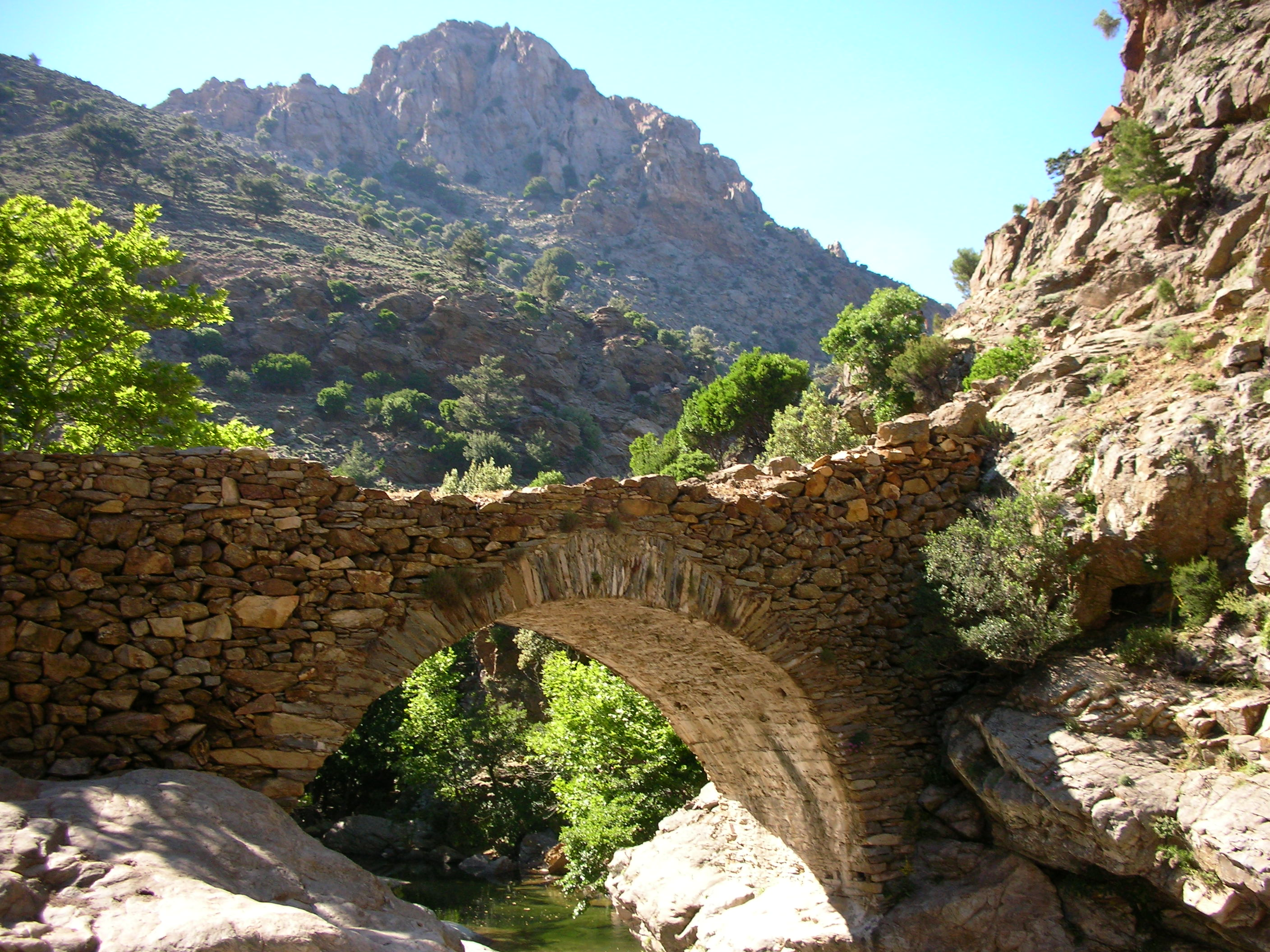
Yiemelia bridge, Raches, built 1880

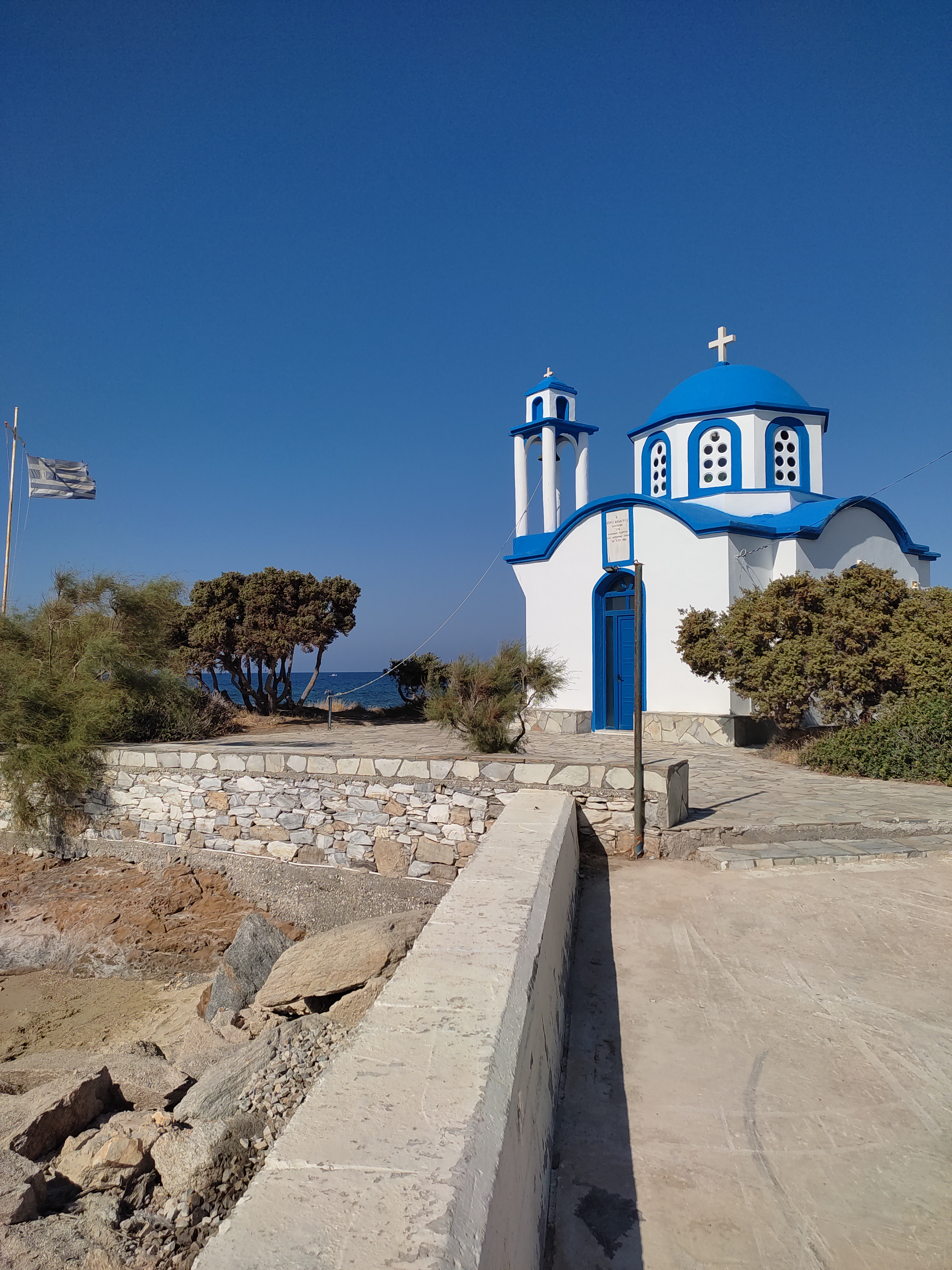
Church of the Ascension of the Lord in Gialiskari

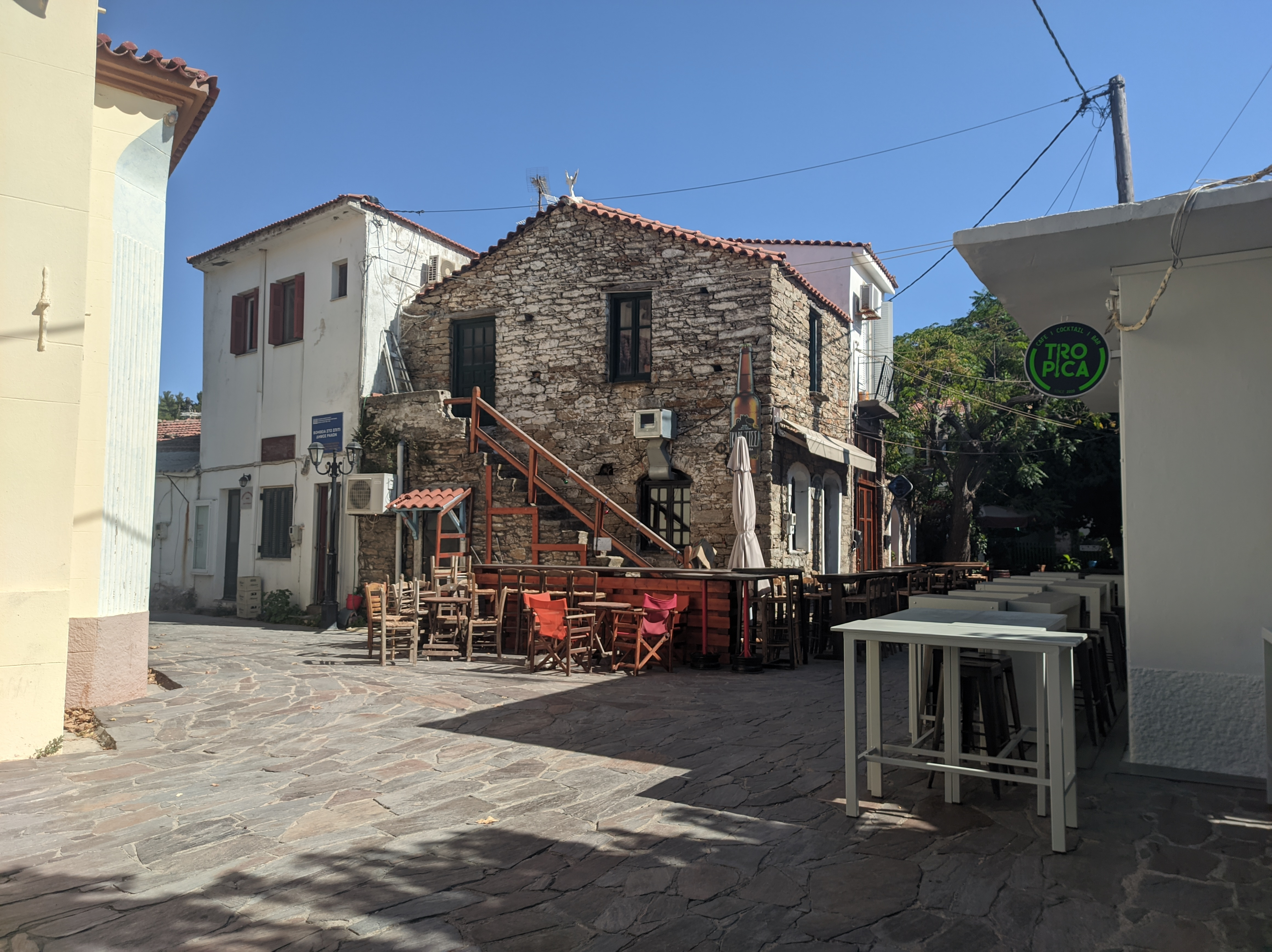
Traditional house in Christos Rachon

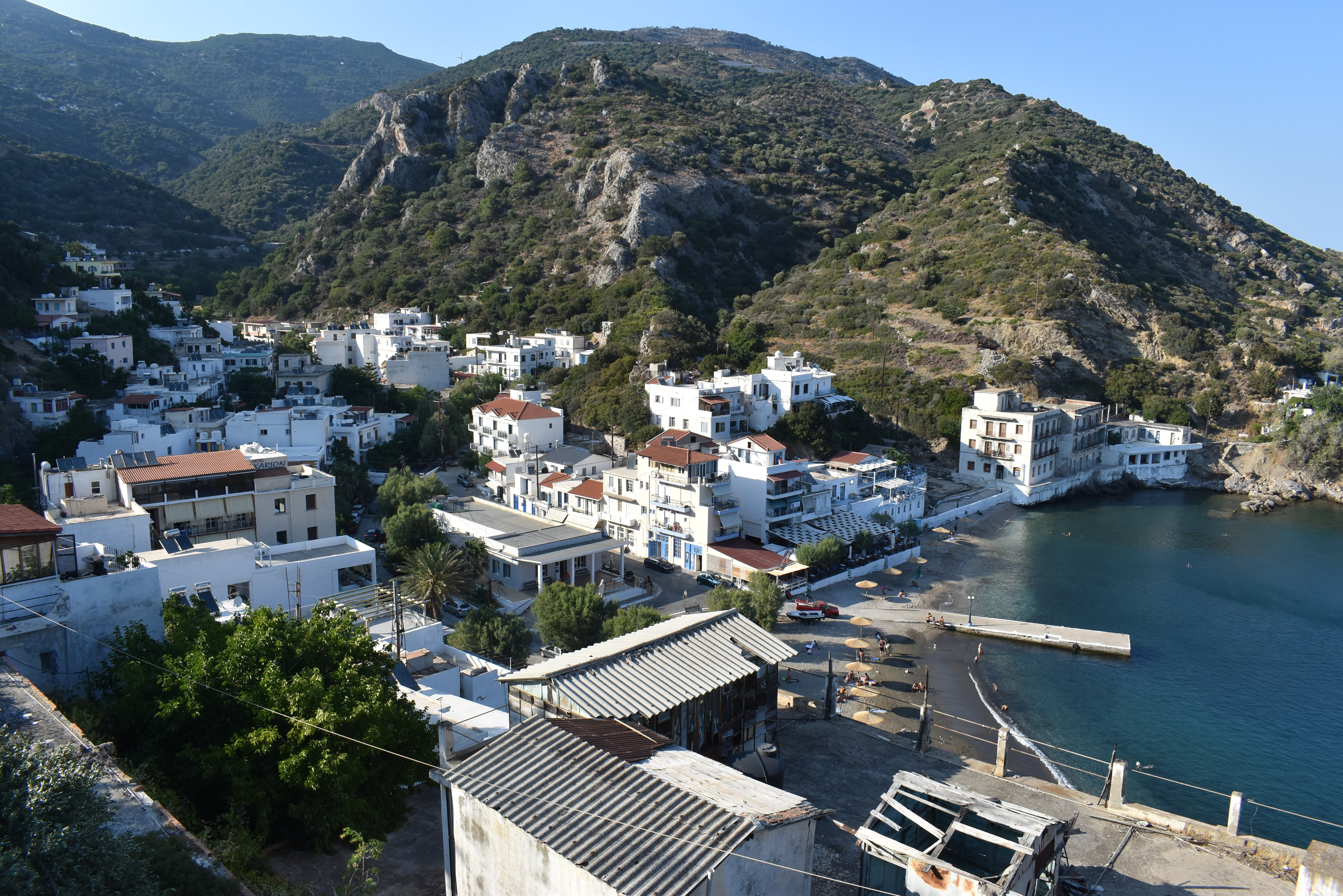
Therma village

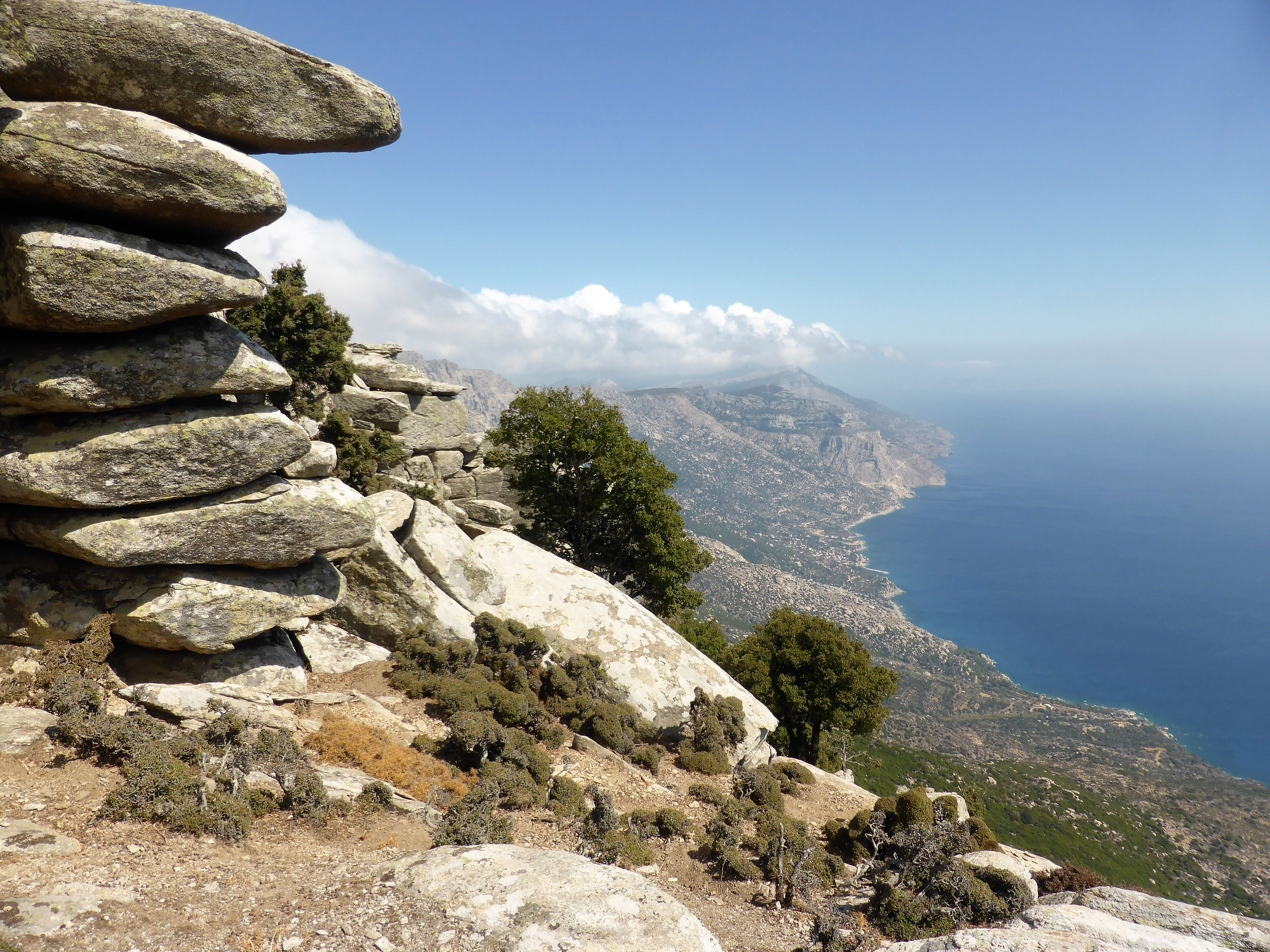
Panorama of the south coast from Pezi, looking eastwards

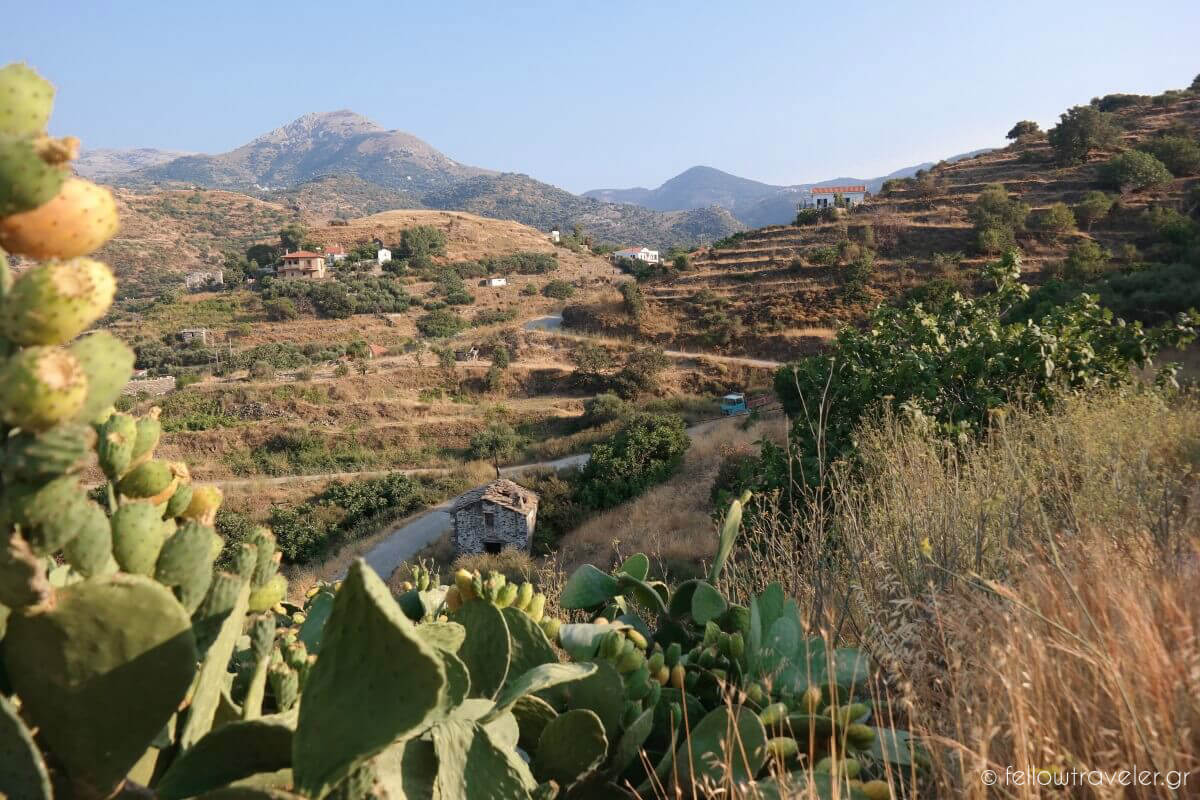
Kampos, Mesaria region

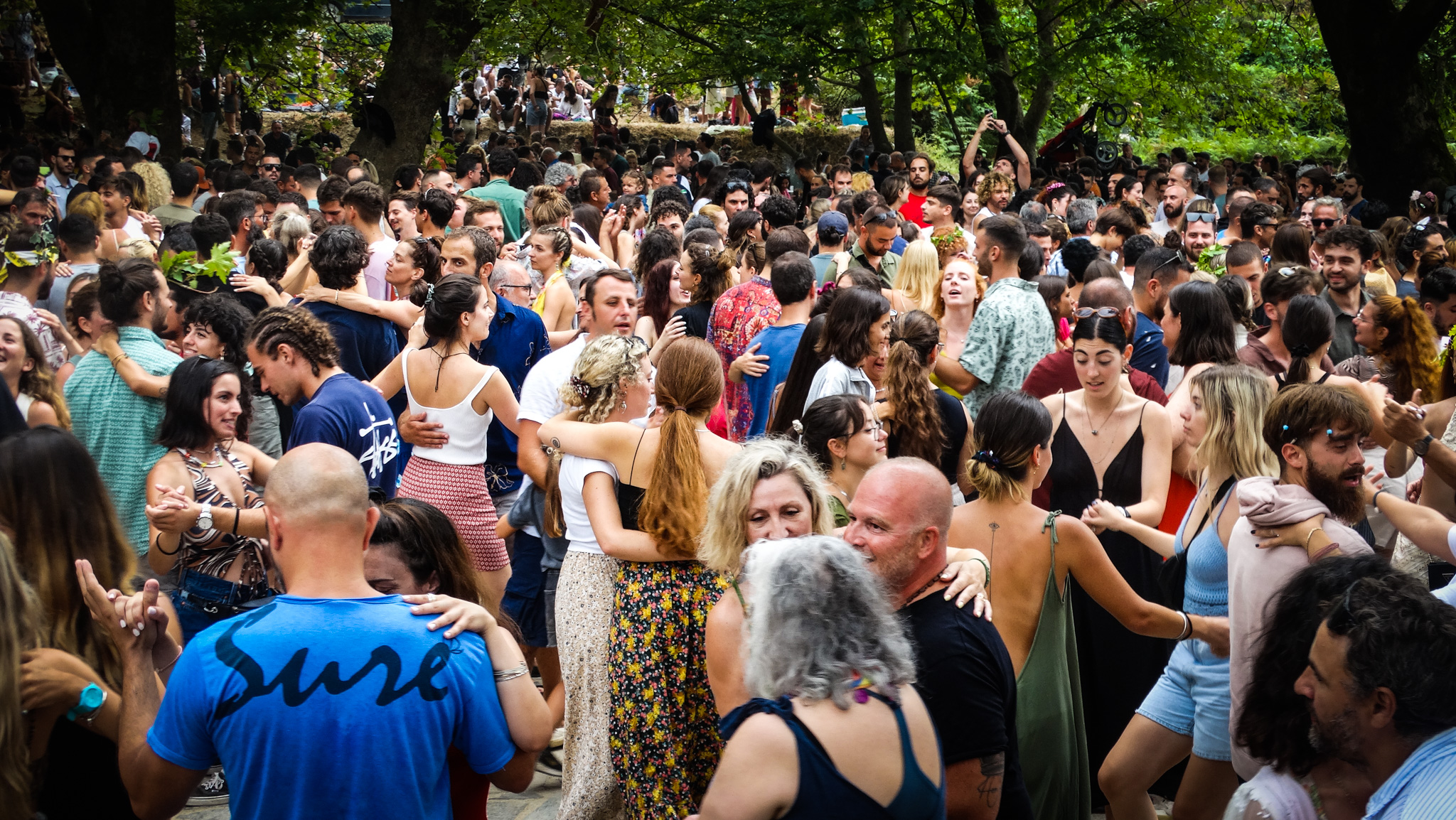
A summer panigyri (festival with traditional music and dancing) in Lagada

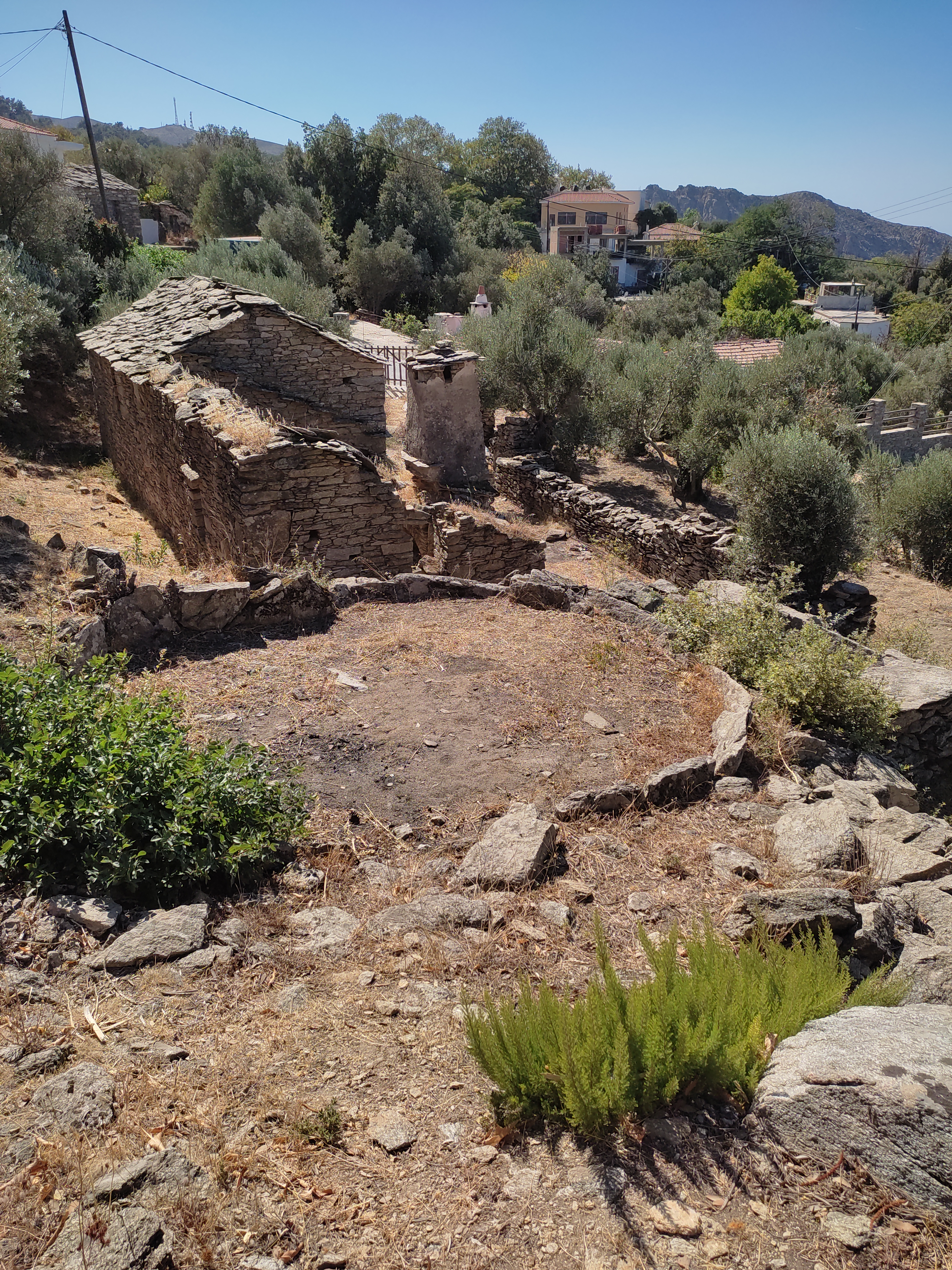
Run-down traditional house in Christos Rachon

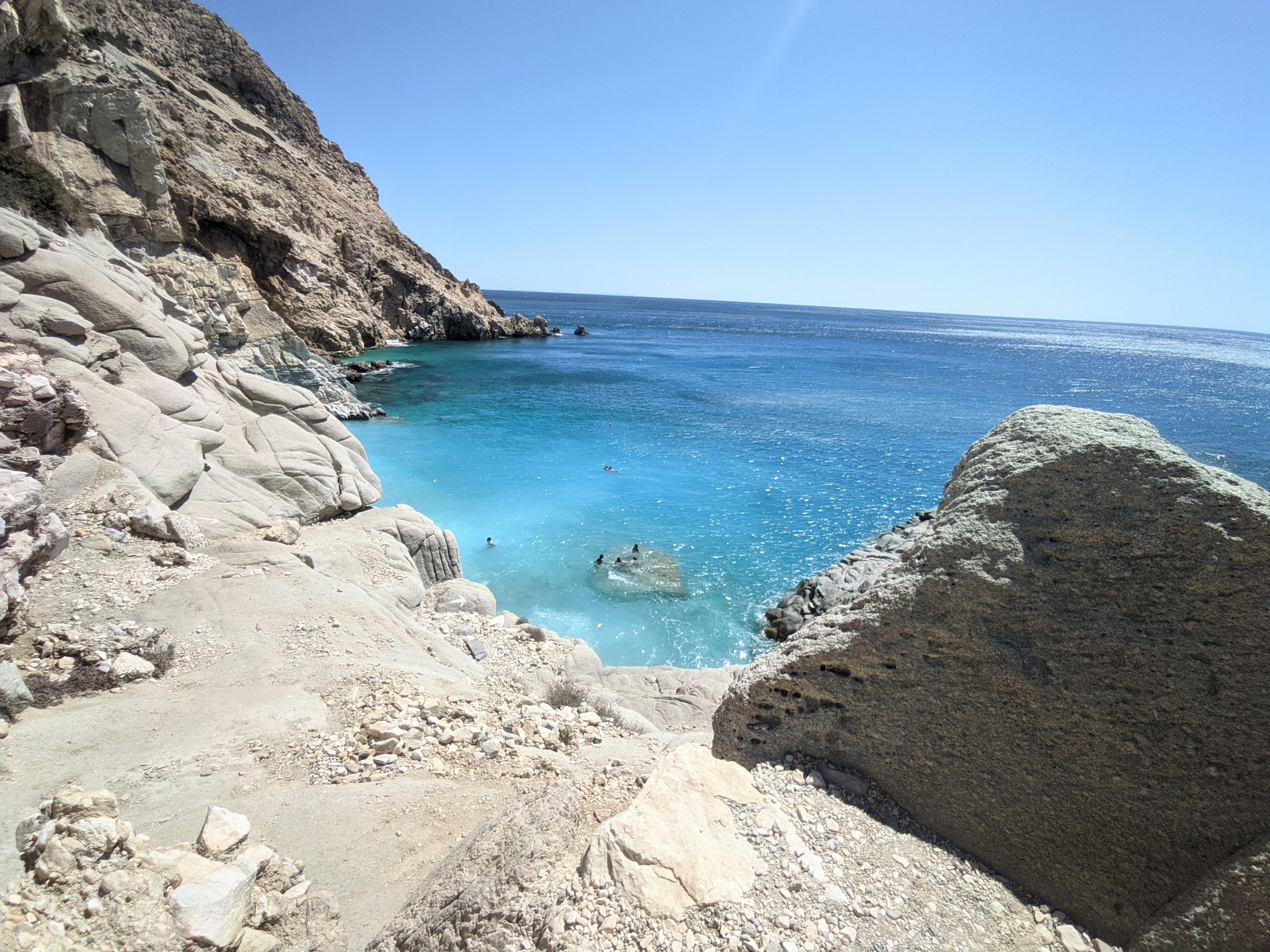
Seychelles beach, the most popular among visitors

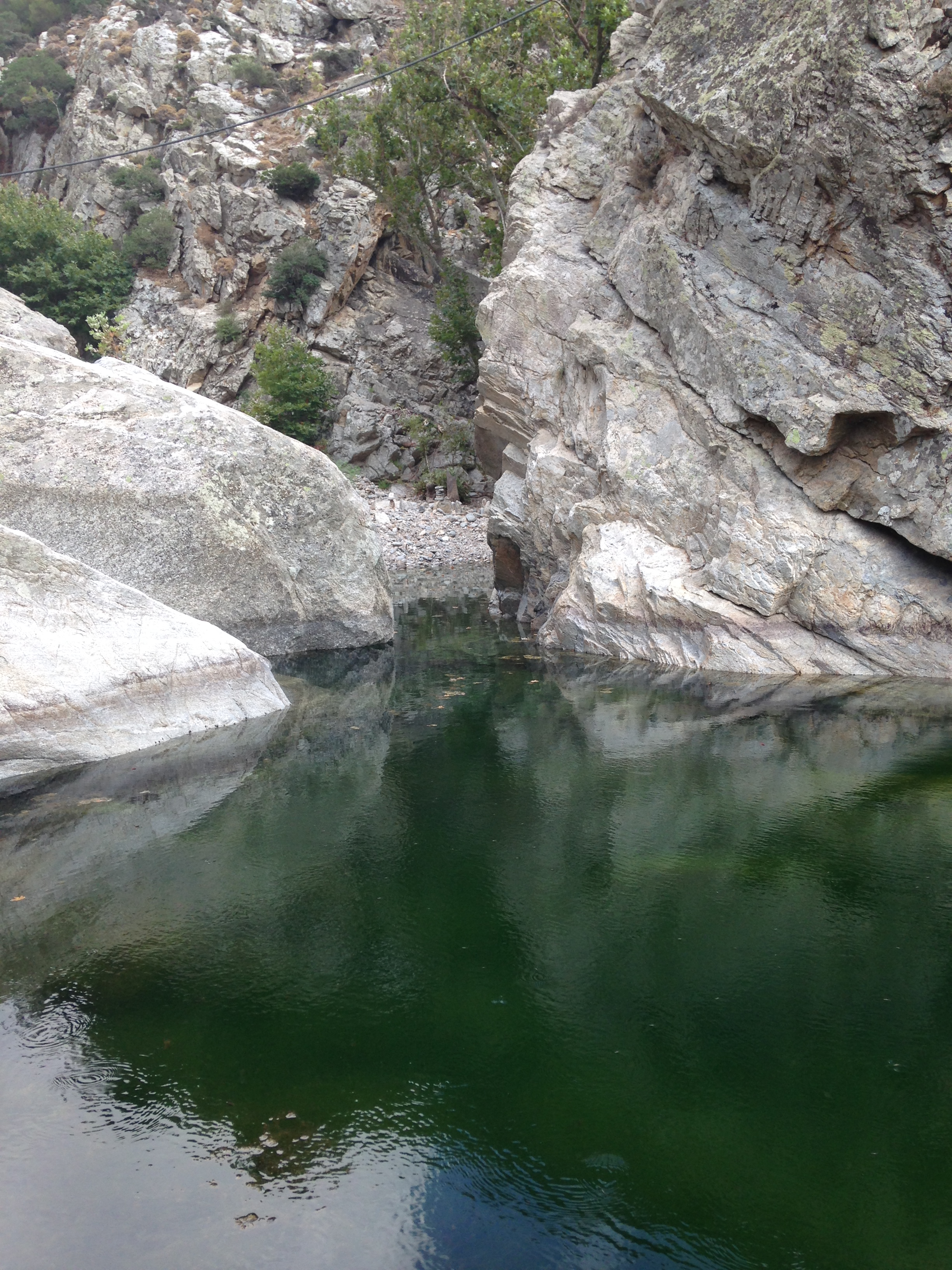
Chalaris river near its source

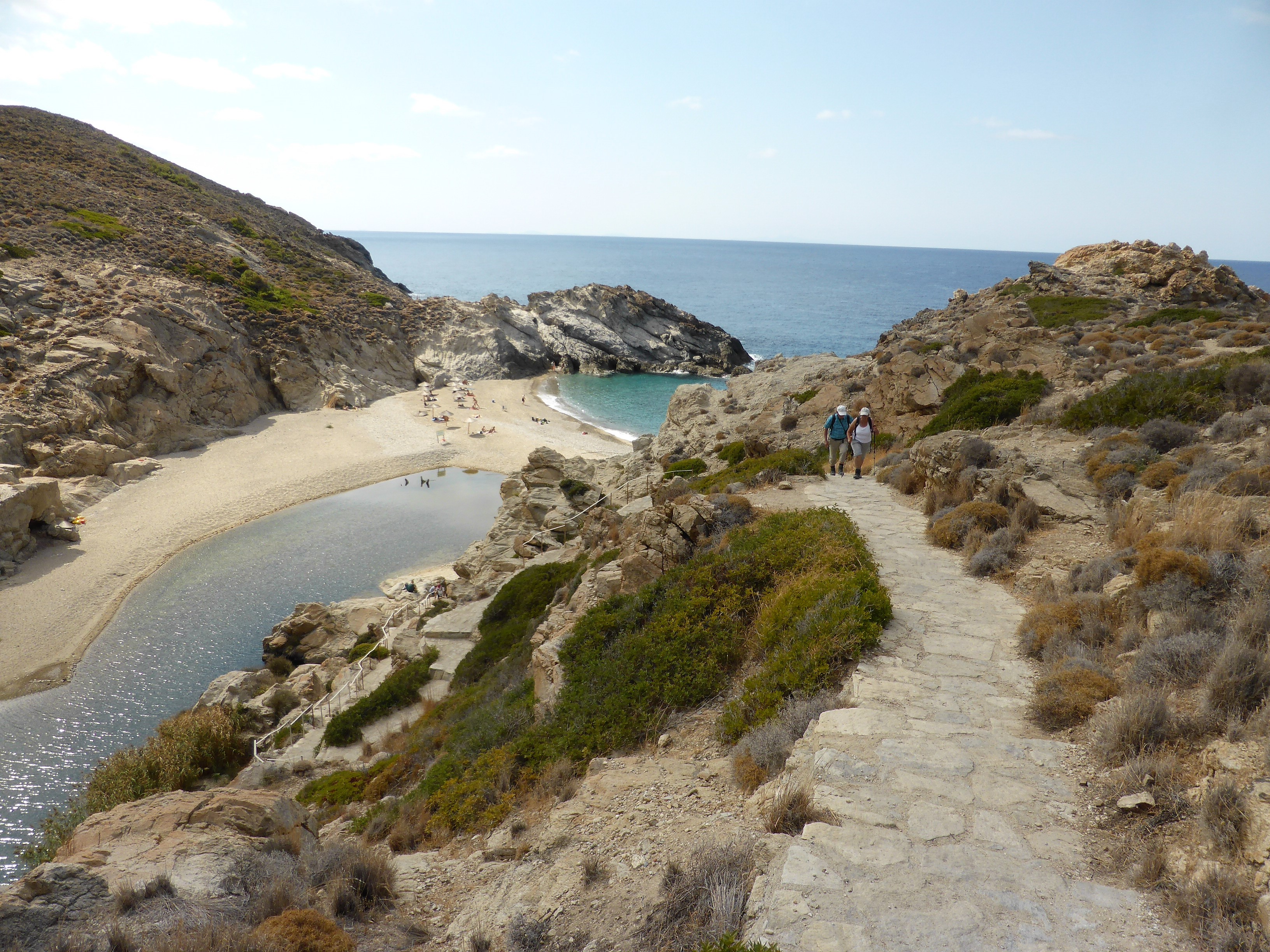
Nas beach, considered one of the most dangerous beaches in Greece

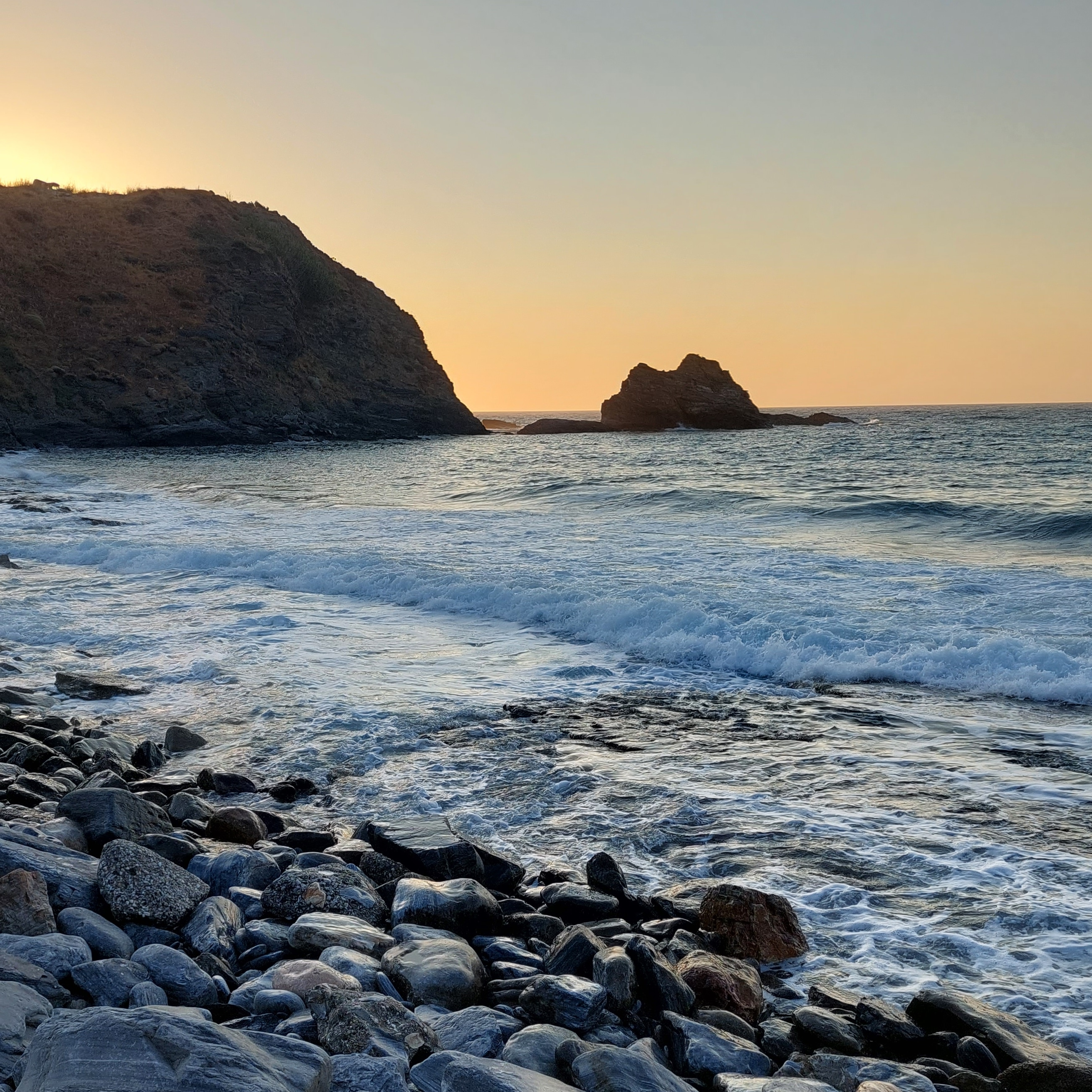
Fitema beach

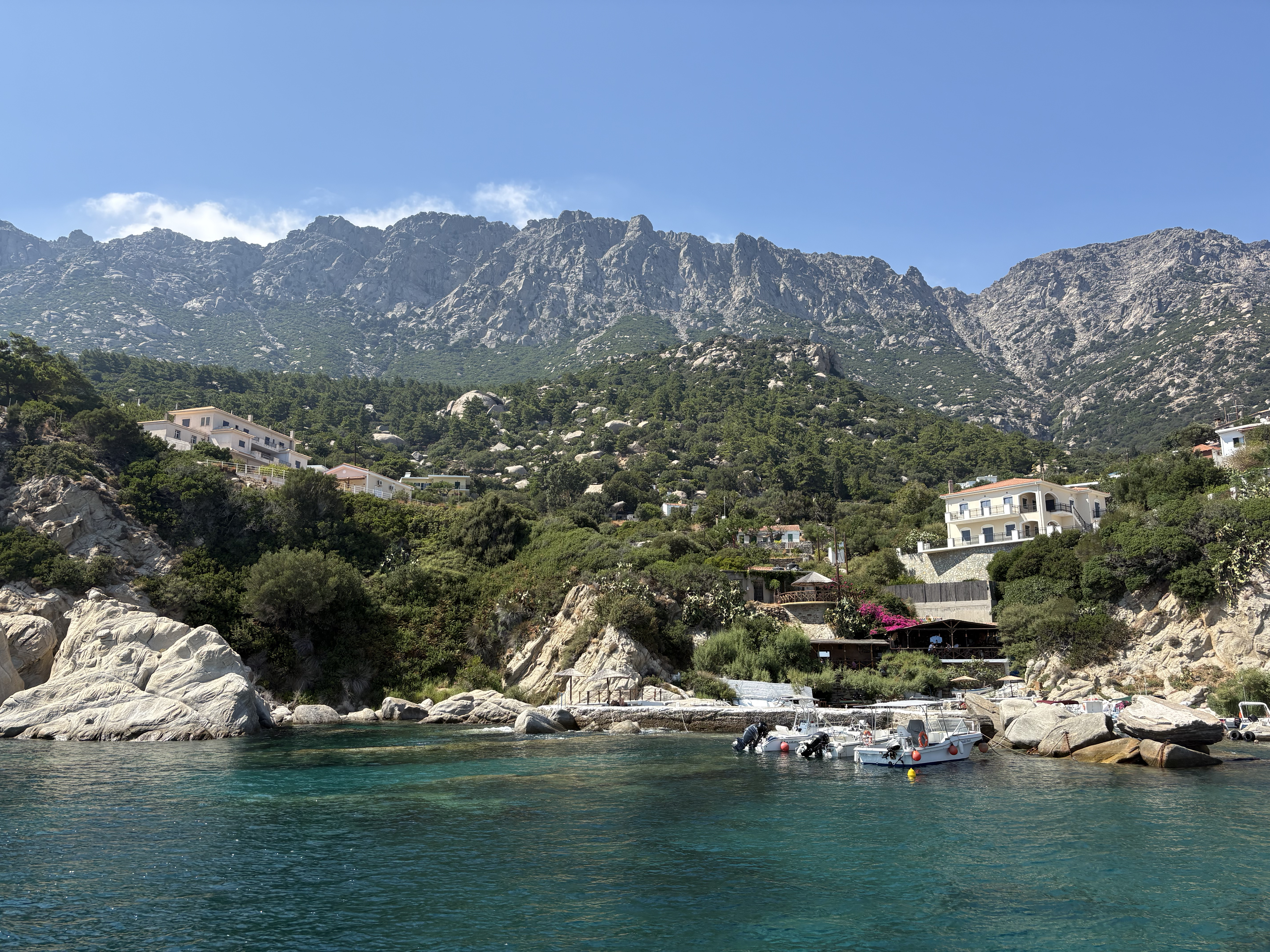
Port of Magganitis

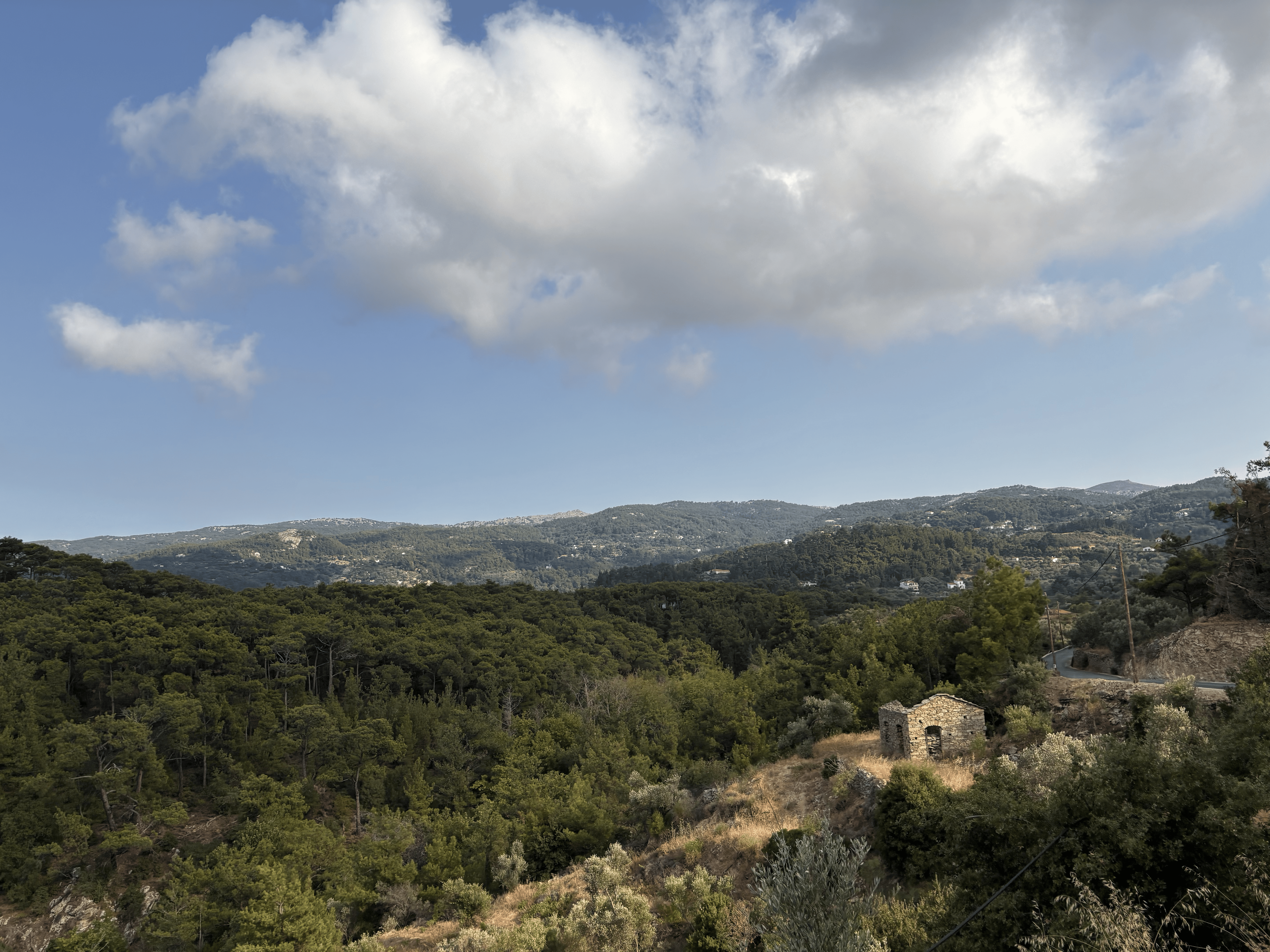
Forest landscape in Raches

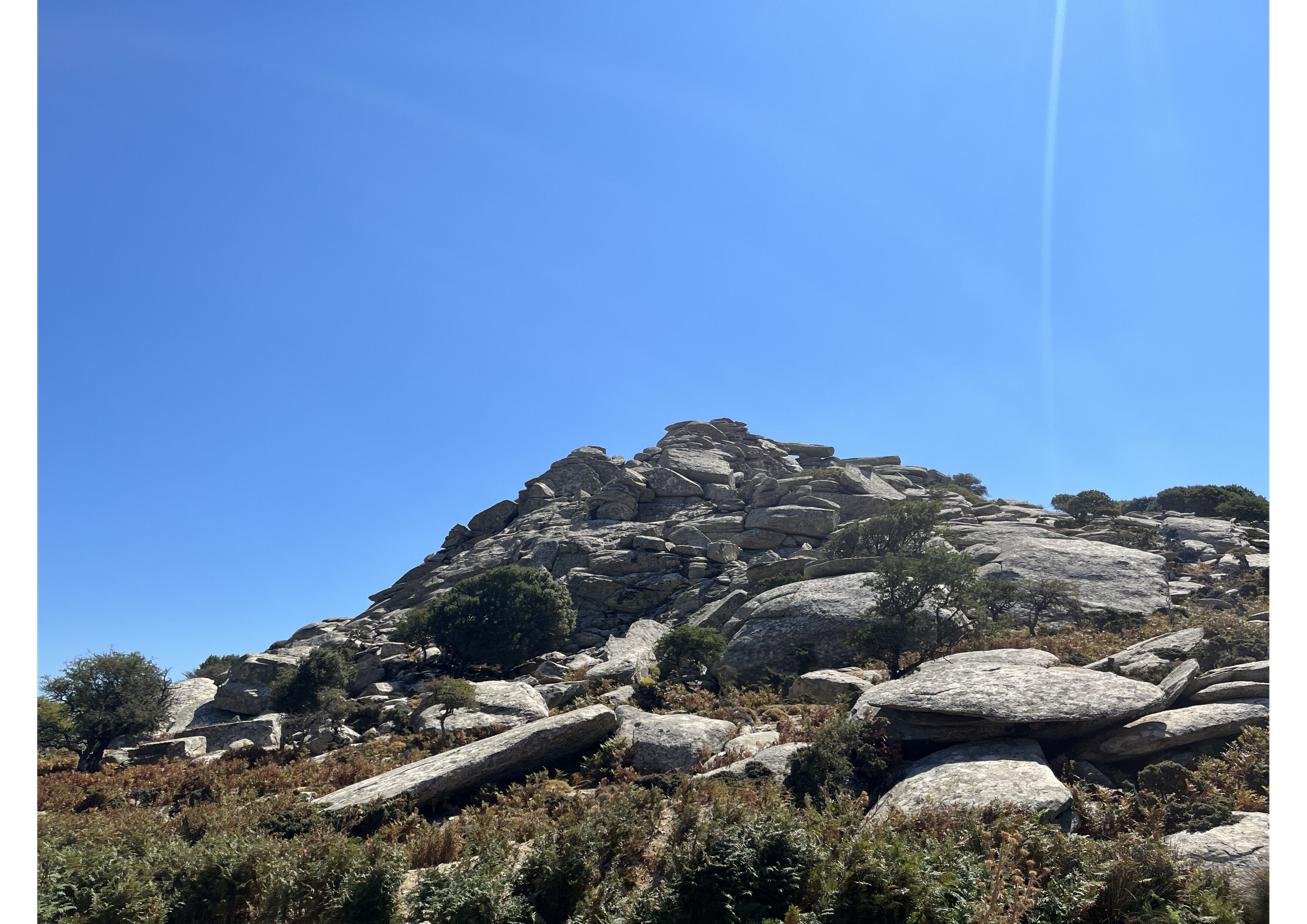
Boulders in Pezi

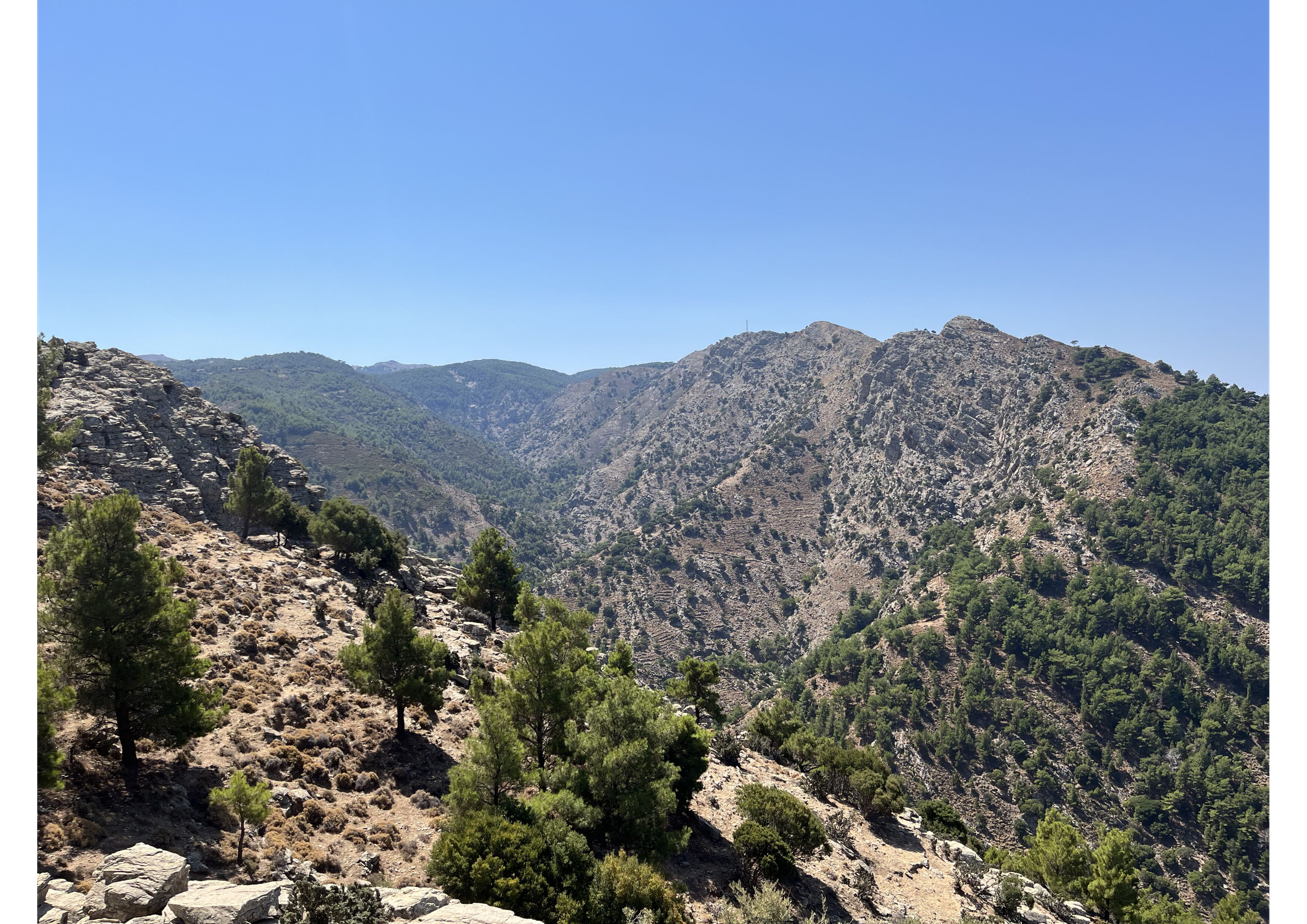
Chalaris gorge

== Notable people ==
- Eleftheria Arvanitaki (born 1957), singer, originates from Ikaria
- Ioannis Malachias (1880–1958), first and only President of the Free State of Ikaria
- Aristides Phoutrides (1887–1927), Harvard professor of classical philology
- Aris Poulianos (1924–2021), anthropologist, born in Ikaria
- Christodoulos I. Stefanadis (born 1947) professor of cardiology, born on Ikaria
- Christodoulos Xiros (born 1958), Greek terrorist (member of the Marxist-Leninist urban guerrilla terrorist organisation 17 November), born in Ikaria
- Anthony Maras, Greek Australian film director
- Chris Kourakis (born 1958), Chief justice of South Australia (2012–2026), parents of Ikarian descent
- Mikis Theodorakis (1925–2021), lived in exile on the island
- Stephan Pastis, American cartoonist
- Alex Carapetis, Australian musician
- Niki Vasilakis, Greek-Australian violinist
- Gust Zarnas, National Football League player

== See also ==
- Pan-Icarian Brotherhood
- Ikaria Island National Airport
