= Karkinagri =

Village in Ikaria, Greece

Karkinagri Καρκινάγρι
- Community
- Location within Greece
- Coordinates: 37°31′08″N 26°01′12″E
- Country: Greece
- Administrative region: North Aegean
- Regional unit: Ikaria
- Municipality: Ikaria
- Municipal unit: Raches

Population (2021)
  - Community: 284
- Time zone: UTC+2 (EET)
  - Summer (DST): UTC+3 (EEST)

Karkinagri (Καρκινάγρι) is a village and a community near the southwestern tip of the Aegean island of Ikaria, Greece. It has about 300 permanent residents. Primarily a fishing village, it is surrounded by rocks and by the Atheras mountain range. It is located near Kavo Pappas.

== History ==
Karkinagri is one of the more recently developed villages on the island. Although tourism has developed on the island, the area was formerly unsafe during times of war. In the past Ikarians built their houses out of rocks to disguise themselves from pirates. Karkinagri was too close to the shore to even be considered a possibility for inhabitance, as any sign of a fire would immediately attract the unwanted attention of pirates.
