= Nas (Ikaria) =

Village on Icaria, Greece

Coordinates: 37°37′19″N 26°03′36″E

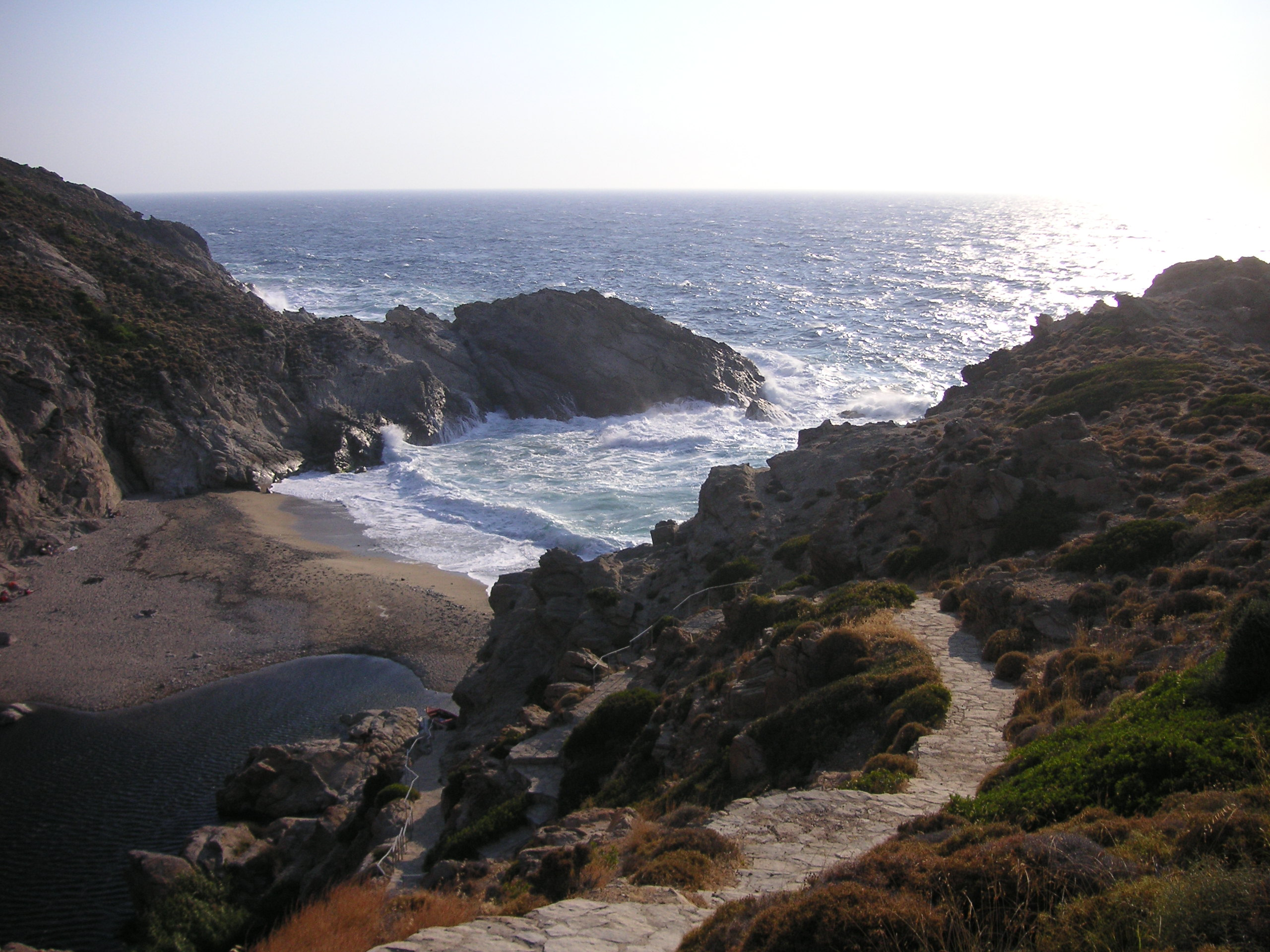
The bay at Nas in rough weather

Nas is a small village on the Greek island of Icaria. It is famous for the beach which is located near the ruins of an ancient temple dedicated to the goddess Artemis.
