= Therma (Icaria) =

Coordinates: 37°38′08″N 26°19′11″E

Therma (demonym; Ancient Greek: Θερμαῖοι), also called Asklepieis, was a town of ancient Greece on the island of Icaria.

Its site is located near modern Therma.
