= List of settlements in the Ikaria regional unit =

This is a list of settlements in the Ikaria regional unit, Greece.

- Agios Kirykos
- Agios Polykarpos
- Arethousa
- Chrysostomos
- Dafni
- Evdilos
- Fournoi Korseon
- Frantato
- Karavostamo
- Karkinagri
- Manganitis
- Perdiki
- Raches

== By municipality ==
Fournoi Korseon (no subdivisions)

== See also ==
- List of towns and villages of Greece
