= Samos Prefecture =

Coordinates: 37°44′N 26°50′E

Samos Prefecture Νομός Σάμου
- Former prefecture
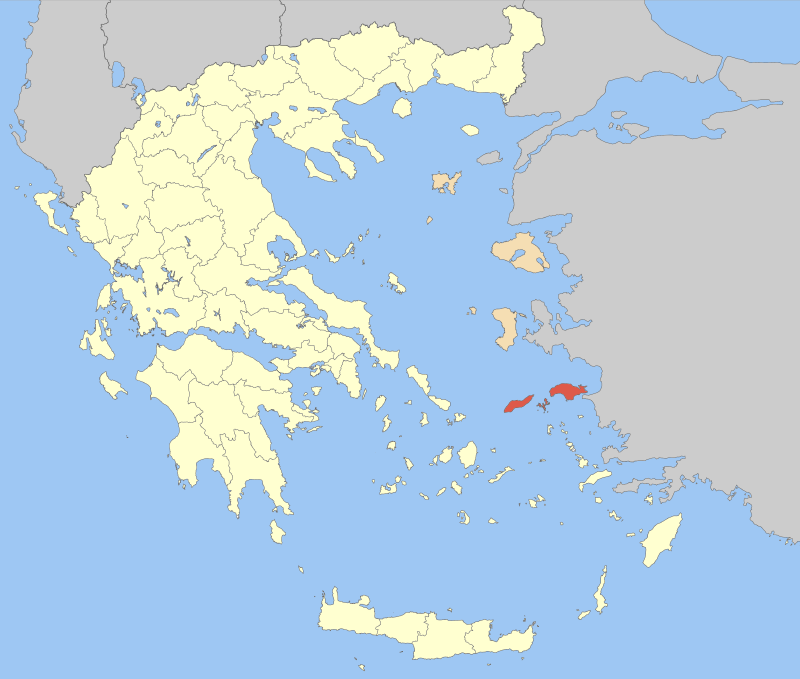
- Location of Samos Prefecture in Greece

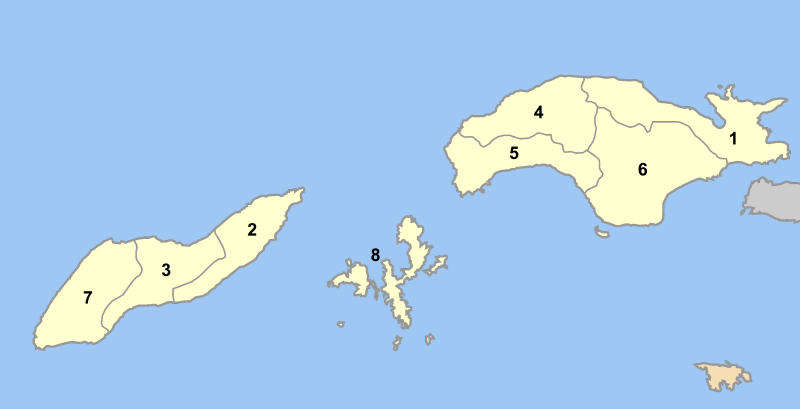
- Location of municipalities within Samos Prefecture Prefecture
- Country: Greece
- Periphery: North Aegean
- Capital: Vathy
- Subdivisions: List: 2 provinces; 8 municipalities; 0 communities

Area
  - Total: 778 km^{2} (300 sq mi)
  - Rank: 50th

Population (2005)
  - Total: 44,114
  - Rank: 49th
  - Density: 56.7/km^{2} (147/sq mi)
  - Rank: 25th
- Postal codes: 83x xx
- Area codes: 227x0
- ISO 3166 code: GR-84
- Vehicle registration: ΜΟ
- Website: www.samos.gr

Samos Prefecture (Greek: Νομός Σάμου) was a prefecture in Greece, consisting of the islands of Samos, Ikaria and the smaller islands of Fournoi Korseon. In 2011 the prefecture was abolished and the territory is now covered by the regional units of Samos and Ikaria. Its capital was the town of Vathy, on Samos.

== Provinces ==
The provinces were:

- Samos Province - Samos
- Ikaria Province - Agios Kirykos

== Municipalities ==
Municipality	Former Municipalities	YPES code	Seat (if different)	Postal code	Area code
Icaria	Agios Kirykos	4601		833 00	22750-2
Icaria	Evdilos	4603		833 02	22750-3
Icaria	Raches	4607		833 01	22750-4
Samos	Karlovasi	4604		832 00	22730-3
Samos	Marathokampos	4605		831 02	22730-3
Samos	Pythagoreio	4606		831 03	22730-6 through 9
Samos	Vathy/Samos	4602		831-00	22730-2
Fournoi Korseon		4608	Fournoi	833 01	22750-5

== See also ==
- The Eupalinian aqueduct
- List of settlements in Samos
- List of settlements in the Ikaria regional unit
