= Perdiki =

Perdiki Περδίκι
- Community
- Location within Greece
- Coordinates: 37°39′43″N 26°18′18″E
- Country: Greece
- Administrative region: North Aegean
- Regional unit: Ikaria
- Municipality: Ikaria
- Municipal unit: Agios Kirykos

Population (2021)
  - Community: 348
- Time zone: UTC+2 (EET)
  - Summer (DST): UTC+3 (EEST)

Perdiki (Greek: Περδίκι) is a village in the northeastern corner of the Greek island of Icaria. Perched up in the mountains, it houses 348 residents (2021) in small houses tucked into the forests. Perdiki is one of the larger villages on Icaria, although its population is spread throughout a plateau.

On the western side of the village, the church of Agia Matrona (meaning: Saint Matrona) stands watch over the village's cemetery, which has been used for hundreds of years.
