= Agios Minas Island =

Greek island in the Fournoi Korseon cluster, North Aegean region, Greece

Agios Minas
Native name: Άγιος Μηνάς
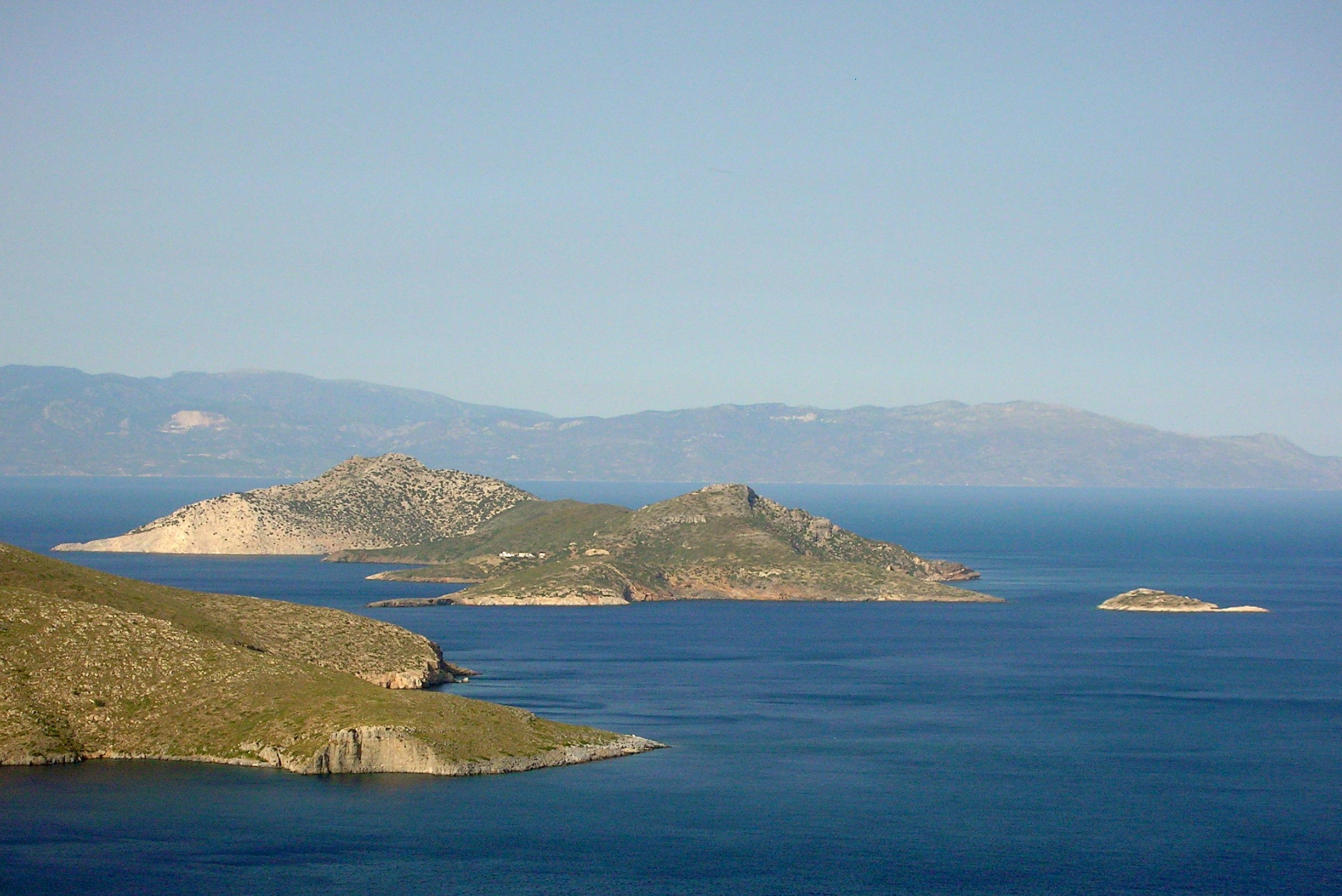
- Agios Minas from Fournoi

- Location within Greece

Geography
- Coordinates: 37.598°N 26.554°E
- Archipelago: North Aegean
- Area: 2.5 km^{2} (0.97 sq mi)

Administration
- Greece
- Region: North Aegean
- Regional unit: Ikaria

Demographics
- Population: 3 (2021)

Agios Minas (Greek: Άγιος Μηνάς) is a Greek island in Fournoi Korseon cluster. It is located east of Fournoi. Agios Minas is the third largest island of the cluster with an area of 2.5 km^{2}. On the island, only a few shepherds live occasionally. The population of the island is 3 inhabitants according to the 2021 census. Administratively, Agios Minas belongs to Ikaria (regional unit) and Fournoi Korseon municipality.

== Nature ==
Agios Minas along with the whole cluster belongs to the network Natura 2000. Important plant species on the island are thyme and common sage. Also, there are important birds such as Eleonora's falcon and European shag.

== Historical population ==
Census	Settlement
1991	0
2001	3
2011	3
2021	3
