= Aqua Jewel =

Greek passenger car ferry

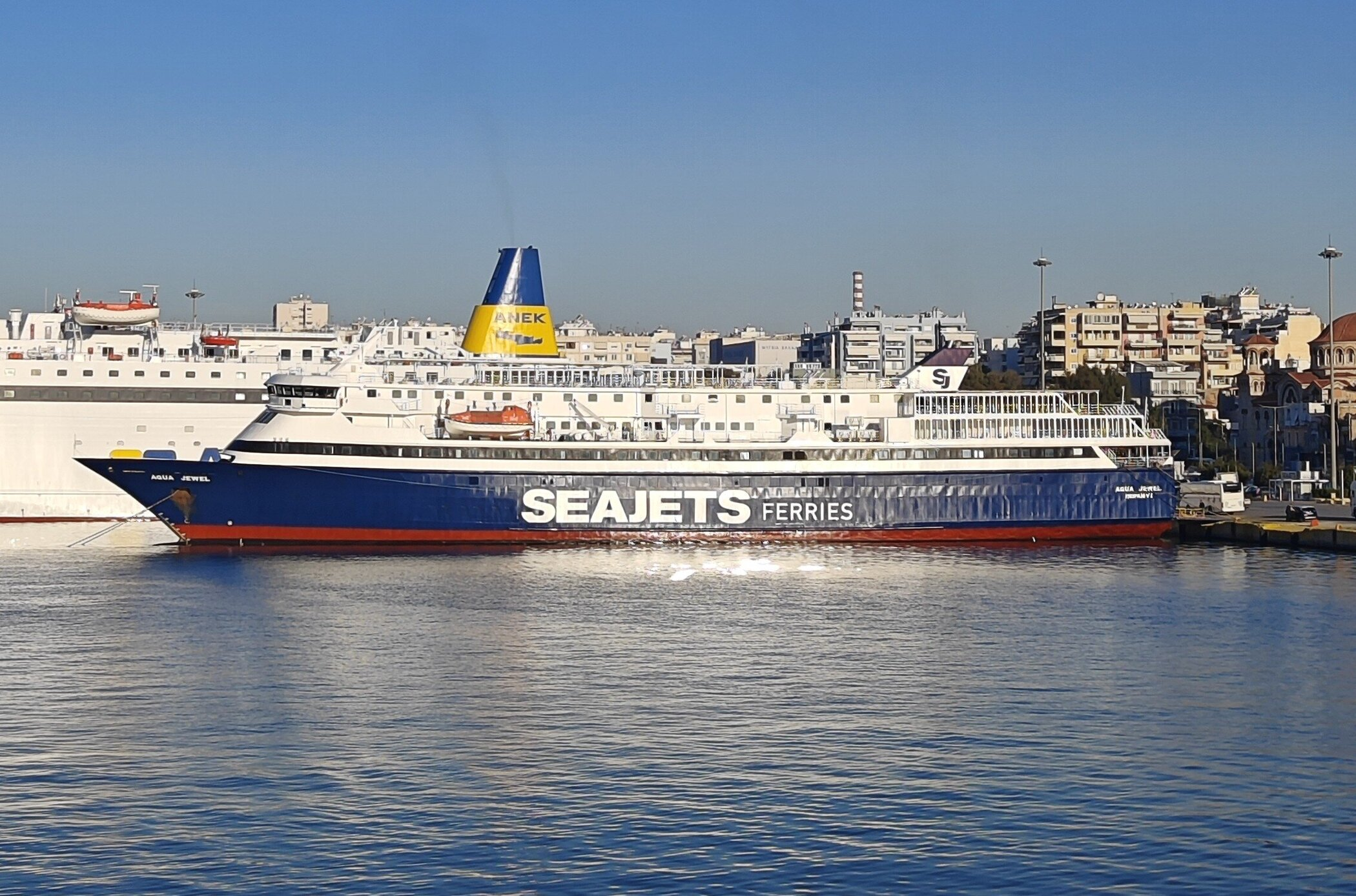
- Aqua Jewel in Piraeus

History
- Name: (2002–2003): Nissilios; (2003–present): Aqua Jewel
- Owner: (2002–2017): Alpha Ferries; (2017–present): Seajets
- Operator: (2003–2010): Alpha Ferries; (2010–2017): NEL Lines (charter); (2017–present): Seajets; (2018–2019 summer charters): Atlânticoline (Azores)
- Port of registry: (2002–present): Piraeus, Greece
- Route: Piraeus – Kythira – Antikythira – Kissamos / Gytheio; Former: Rafina – Andros – Tinos – Mykonos; Former: Lavrio – Agios Efstratios – Lemnos – Kavala; Former: Azores inter-island routes (charter)
- Ordered: Late 1980s
- Builder: Perama Shipyards; Attica, Greece
- Cost: $25 million
- Launched: 2002
- Completed: September 2002
- Acquired: September 2002 (as Nissilios) 2017 (by SeaJets)
- Maiden voyage: Spring 2003
- In service: 2003
- Identification: IMO number: 8976671; Call sign: SZLD; MMSI number: 239981000
- Status: In service
- Designer: Stephen Payne

General characteristics
- Type: Ferry
- Tonnage: 3,934 GT
- Length: 347 ft 9 in (106 m)
- Beam: 52 ft 6 in (16 m)
- Draught: 12 ft 4 in (3.75 m)
- Decks: 8
- Installed power: 2 × MAN-B&W × 5680 kW); 3 × Caterpillar electric engines
- Speed: 18 knots (33 km/h; 21 mph)
- Capacity: 1,600 passengers (summer); 661 passengers (winter); 160 private vehicles

Aqua Jewel is a Greek passenger car ferry, which is part of the fleet of Seajets. She was built in 2003 in Perama, Attica and was put into service at SeaJets in 2017 (She had previously been operated by other companies). The ship initially belonged to the shipowner Georgios Perogiannakis and in 2010 she was chartered by the Shipping Company of Lesvos - NEL Lines. Since 2017, she belongs to SeaJets, which occasionally charters her to Atlanticoline. At the time of her construction, the Aqua Jewel was the largest passenger ferry ever built in Greece, with a length of 108 meters (354 ft 4 in). She no longer holds this record, since the construction of Hellenic Seaways' 141-meter (462 ft 7 in)-long Nissos Mykonos (now Blue Star Myconos). The Aqua Jewel was intended as a mega-yacht named Nissilios, while the initial cost was about 25,000,000 US dollars. The Aqua Jewel has a maximum speed of 18.5 knots (34.3 km/h; 21.3 mph) and a cruising (service) speed of 0.5 knots (0.93 km/h; 0.58 mph) lower than the maximum. Aqua Jewel facilities include two bars, a hospital and a helipad. On 6 February 2024 she was accidentally beached while exiting the port of Diakoftiou in Kythera.

== History ==
=== Construction ===
Construction of the ship began in the late 1980s, intended to be used as an 80-passenger yacht named Nissilios, and costing approximately $25 million. Following the ship's foreclosure due to unpaid debts, Sea Venture Cruises considered purchasing and renovating the Nissilios for use as a 400-passenger cruise ship named Sea Venture, but ultimately acquired the Taygetos instead.

In 1998 the Nissilios was bought by Alpha Ferries of Georgios Perogiannakis and converted into a passenger and vehicle ferry with its current name. Although large sums of money were allocated for her safety, she had several problems due to her construction, which affected his later career. The use of aluminum on the shared decks made her quite light, while its small draft negatively affected the trip in bad weather conditions. Although the bow propeller was a waterjet type, something that was considered an innovation, it was quite weak. She was finally completed in September 2002.

=== Launch ===
The original plans were to launch the Cyclades mainland lines as a subsidy, but the proposal was rejected and so, in the spring of 2003 it was launched between Rafina-Andros-Tinos-Mykonos, with Captain Isidoros Mamidis as the captain. Although it stood out on the line, it did not take long for the disadvantages to become apparent, as a result of which it could not compete with the MS Penelope A and MS Superferry II, which, although older, were faster and more reliable and popular.

In view of all the above problems, the shipowner decided to make some improvements to the ship in order to increase its reliability. In 2004, the bow was converted into a bulbous bow, but that was not enough to solve her problems. Thus, in 2005 she was extended from 96 meters (315 ft 0 in) to 108 meters by adding a 12-meter (39 ft 4 in) section on the Lamba shipyards of Elefsina, the left "loft" was removed, a traditional propeller was added to the bow and a second pair of stabilizers, as well as a separate passenger ramp. In 2006, a new exterior was added to deck 7, in 2007 a second rudder was added and the fuel was changed from marine diesel to marine fuel and in 2008 awnings were placed atop the bridge. In 2009, she stopped from her usual routes and in February 2010 it was launched between Lavrio-Agios Efstratios-Lemnos-Kavala. Then, she was chartered by NEL Lines and launched on Lavrio - Kea - Kythnos - Syros - Paros - Naxos - Ios - Sikinos - Folegandros - Kimolos - Milos route replacing the HSC Aeolos Kenteris I. In November 2014, she was laid-up in Drapetsona, due to a failure of the left engine.

=== Return to service ===
While the ship was laid up, she could not be repaired, although NEL Lines assured the Ministry of Shipping to the contrary, while there were debts of the accrued 20 crew members, which remained unsecured. In 2015, with the dissolution of NEL, she was transferred to the Tsagarinou shipyards in Perama, Attica and returned to Alpha Ferries, but it never managed to be utilized, although the shipowner planned to launch it between Volos-Skiathos-Skopelos-Alonissos. In mid-2017, she was purchased by Seajets to replace the Aqua Spirit. Finally, she returned to operational condition and on 18 August 2017 she started operating. During the 2018 and 2019 summers, she was chartered in the Azores for Atlanticoline, while in March 2020 she was launched on the Piraeus-Kythira-Antikythira-Kissamos-Gythio route, operating there everesince.

== Characteristics ==
The Aqua Jewel has three ramps (two for vehicles and one for passengers), a main garage for vehicles, as well as "vehicle lofts", which are used mainly on the local route Gythio-Kythira-Antikythira-Kissamos. For passengers, she has escalators, living room, reception, 60 air-type seats, two lounges with tables, seats and sofas, two bars, a playground, open decks, 15 outdoor double cabins, 2 LUX cabins, as well as a hospital, a VIP room, a clothing store and special areas for the disabled. In total, she has 8 decks.

The ship is powered by two MAN-B&W engines with a combined power of 5,680 kilowatts (7,620 hp) and a consumption of 1.3 tons per hour, while she also has three Caterpillar electric motors. The vessel has a length 108 meters (354 ft 4 in), a width of 16 meters (52 ft 6 in) and a draft of 4.50 meters (14 ft 9 in). It has two rudders for flexibility in difficult ports and has pairs of stabilizers for sailing in rough seas. It also has a bulbous bow for better navigation in rough seas, weighing 20 tons, permanent fire extinguishing system, an elevator and two bow propellers, a traditional one and a waterjet type and has a total capacity of 3,934 gross tonnage (GT).

== Accidents and Incidents ==
=== 2012 allision ===
While departing the port of Kavala for Lemnos with 40 passengers on board, the vessel struck the quay and two moored ships. The impact resulted in minor damage, including several dents and cracks above the waterline, while the other two vessels also sustained minor damage. No injuries or marine pollution were reported. Local authorities subsequently detained the ship pending an investigation into the incident.

==== 2021 grounding (Gytheio) ====
On 8 December 2021, during the evening hours, the vessel ran aground in shallow waters within the harbor basin of Gytheio. The ship had departed from Kythira for Gytheio carrying 30 passengers and 36 crew members on a scheduled itinerary, and had intended to remain at the port due to prevailing adverse weather conditions.

A Hellenic Coast Guard patrol boat immediately rushed to the scene. No injuries, water ingress, or marine pollution were reported. An inspection of the ship's hull by a private diver confirmed that the vessel had settled safely on a sandy seabed.

During the morning hours of 10 December 2021, the vessel was successfully refloated with the assistance of the tugboat Panthir. The ferry then maneuvered under its own power and safely docked at the port of Gytheio, where all passengers disembarked and vehicles were unloaded without incident. No marine pollution was detected.

The Gytheio Port Authority initially issued a detention order, but cleared the vessel to resume its voyages after its classification society presented a certificate maintaining its class.

===== 2024 grounding (Kythira) =====
On 6 February 2024, during its departure from the port of Diakofti on Kythira for Kissamos, Crete, the vessel ran aground on the breakwater amidst adverse weather conditions with winds reaching 5 to 6 Beaufort. The ship was carrying eight passengers and 40 crew members, all of whom were reported safe.

According to the captain, the grounding caused a hull breach resulting in controlled water ingress. The local port authority immediately activated its local emergency and pollution response plan. The Kythira Port Department of the Neapolis Voion Port Authority banned the vessel from departing pending a technical inspection by a specialized team and a professional diver.
