= Thymaina =

Greek island

Native name: Θύμαινα
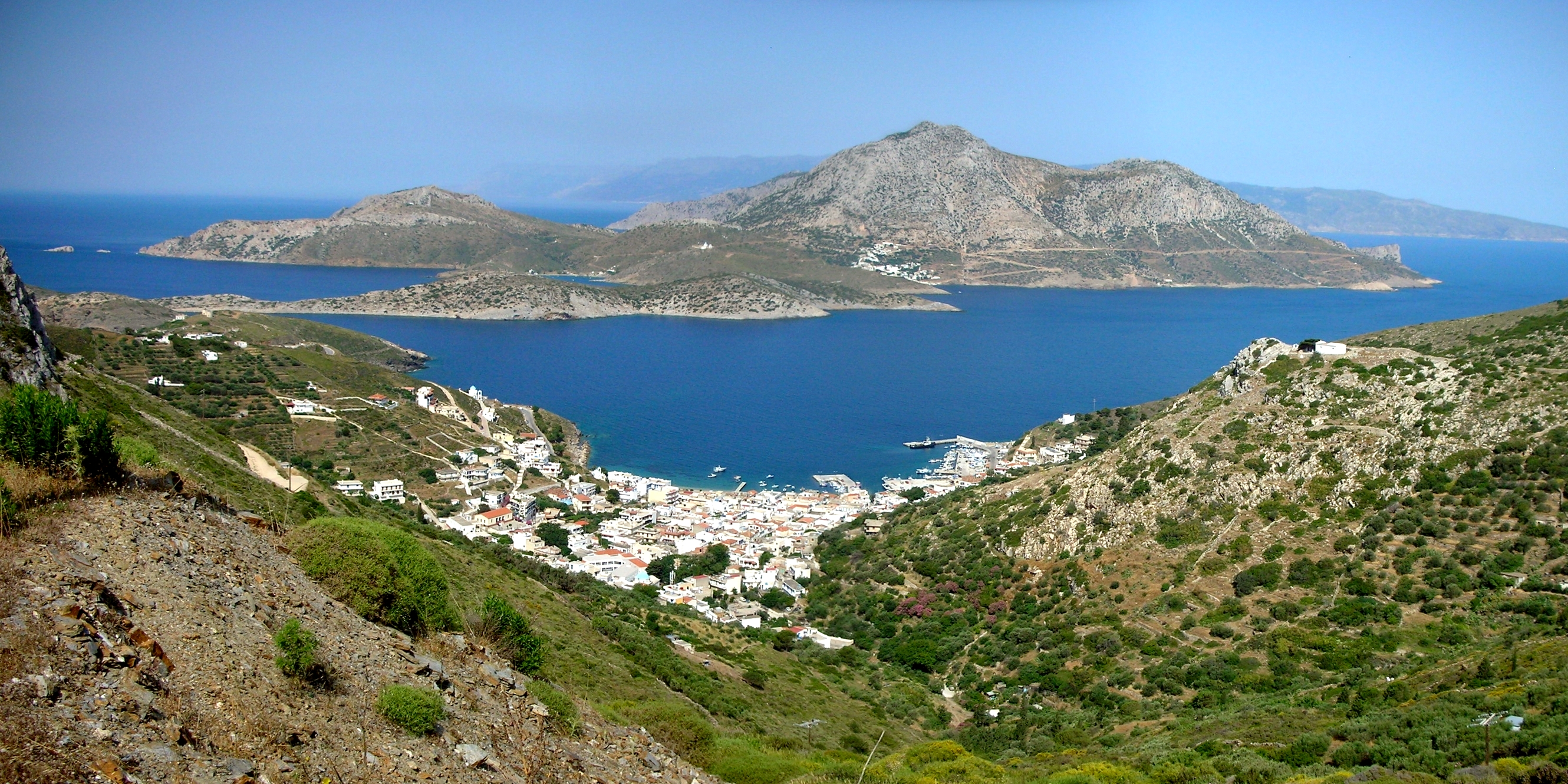
- The island as seen from Fourni Korseon

- Location within Greece

Geography
- Coordinates: 37.58°N 26.44°E
- Archipelago: North Aegean
- Area: 10 km^{2} (3.9 sq mi)
- Highest elevation: 26 m (85 ft)

Administration
- Greece
- Region: North Aegean
- Regional unit: Ikaria
- Capital city: Thymaina

Demographics
- Population: 191 (2021)
- Pop. density: 14/km^{2} (36/sq mi)

Additional information
- Postal code: 833 xx
- Area code: 22750
- Vehicle registration: MO

Thymaina (Greek: Θύμαινα) is a small Greek island in the Ikaria regional unit, in the eastern Aegean Sea. Thymaina is located just west of Fournoi Korseon and is administratively a part of its municipality. Its name is said to be derived from the thyme that grows throughout the island. Thymaina has two settlements, Thymaina settlement and Keramidou. The population of the island is 191 inhabitants according to the 2021 census, 179 in Thymaina settlement and 12 in Kerameidou. The area is 10 square kilometres (4 sq mi). Thymaina is a protected area along with all Fournoi cluster and belongs to the network Natura 2000.

== Historical population ==
Census	Island
1991	156 (Thymaina 147, Kerameidou 9)
2001	152 (Thymaina 140, Kerameidou 12)
2011	143 (Thymaina 136, Kerameidou 7)
2021	191 (Thymaina 179, Kerameidou 12)
