= Blue Star Myconos =

Greek Ropax Ferry

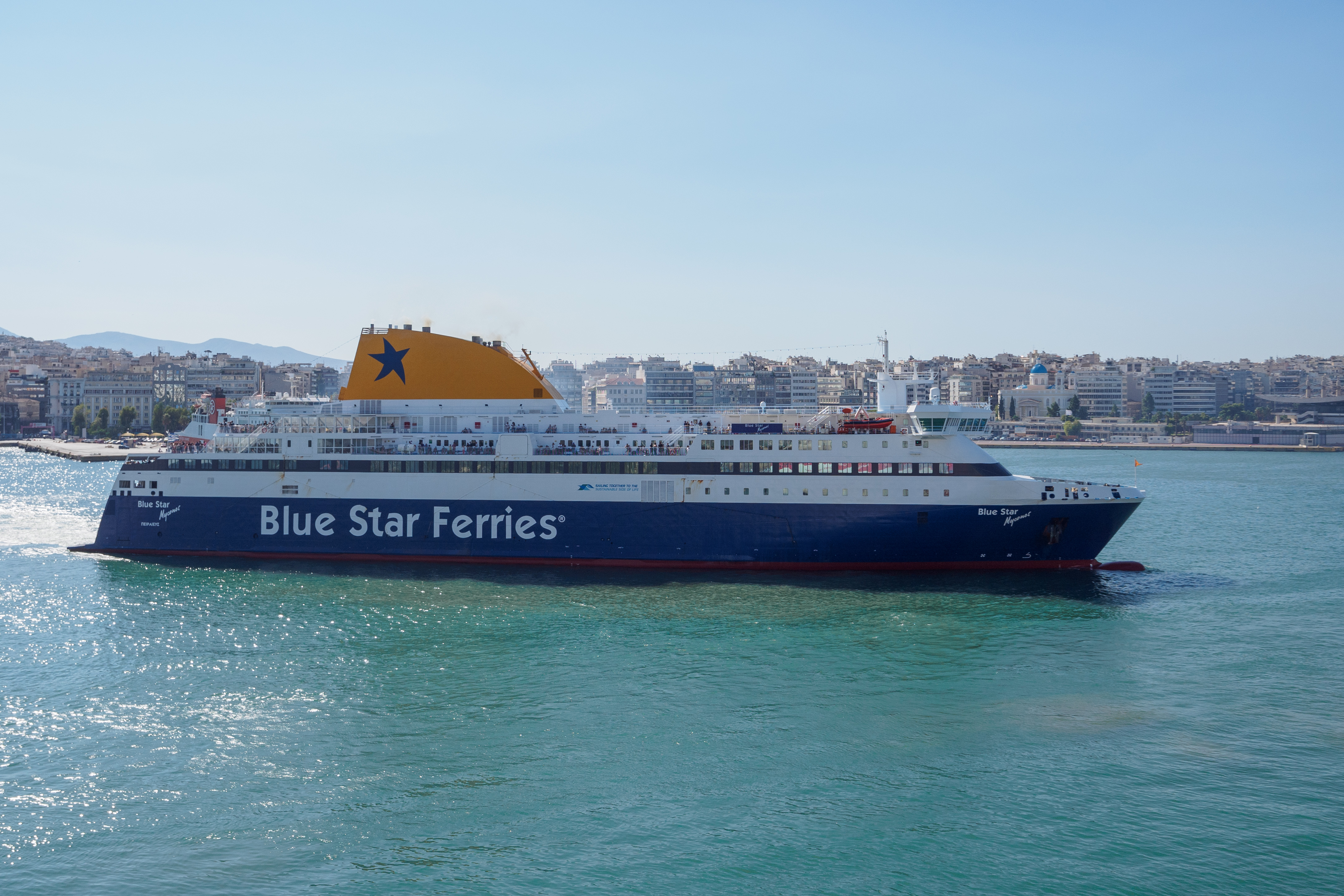
- Blue Star Myconos in Piraeus

History
- Name: 2005–2020: Nissos Mykonos; 2020–present: Blue Star Myconos
- Owner: 2005–2020: Hellenic Seaways; 2020–present: Attica Group
- Operator: 2005–2020: Hellenic Seaways; 2020–present: Blue Star Ferries
- Port of registry: 2005–present: Piraeus, Greece
- Route: Piraeus – Syros – Mykonos – Ikaria – Samos – Chios – Mytilene – Lemnos – Kavala / Thessaloniki
- Ordered: 8 February 1999
- Builder: Hellenic Shipyards Co.; Skaramagas, Greece
- Yard number: 701
- Launched: 2005
- Completed: September 2005
- Acquired: 2005
- Maiden voyage: September 2005
- In service: 2005
- Identification: IMO number: 9208679; Call sign: SYJZ; MMSI number: 240389000
- Status: in service

General characteristics
- Class & type: Fast Ro-Pax Ferry
- Tonnage: 14,717 GT
- Length: 141.0 m (462 ft 7 in)
- Beam: 21.0 m (68 ft 11 in)
- Draft: 5.2 m (17 ft 1 in)
- Decks: 8
- Ramps: Stern vehicle loading ramps
- Installed power: 4 × Wärtsilä 12V38 main diesel engines (total 31,680 kW)
- Propulsion: 2 × controllable pitch propellers
- Speed: 25.0 knots (46.3 km/h; 28.8 mph) (service) / 28.0 knots (51.9 km/h; 32.2 mph) (max)
- Capacity: 1,915 passengers (31 cabins / 104 berths); 418 cars / 430 lane metres
- Crew: 76
- Notes: Sister ship to Blue Star Chios

Blue Star Myconos (Greek: Μπλού Στάρ Μύκονος) is a ferry owned by Blue Star Ferries that currently operates most commonly on the Piraeus-Syros-Mykonos-Ikaria Agios Kyrikos/Ikaria Evdilos-Samos Karlovasi-Samos Vathy-Chios-Mytilene-Lemnos-Kavala-Thessaloniki route. It is driven by four Wartsila 12V38 main diesel engines and has an operating speed of 25 knots, making it faster than all other big ferries currently serving the Cyclades Islands and North Aegean. The ferry is a sister ship to Blue Star Chios.

== Service History ==
The ship was ordered by Gerasimos Strintzis in the mid 90's on behalf of "Strintzis Lines" and launched at Hellenic Shipyards Co. originally named Superferry Chios. In the year 2000, and while the construction of the ship was ongoing, Strintzis Lines were sold, and the order cancelled. The ship remained unfinished until 2005. Upon building completion the ship was renamed Nissos Mykonos and was delivered by Gerasimos Strintzis, then chairman and general manager of Hellenic Seaways.

The ship is named after the Greek island of Mykonos.

In January 2020 Nissos Mykonos was renamed Blue Star Myconos.

== Accidents and Incidents ==
=== 2013 fire ===
On 14 June 2013, a fire broke out aboard the passenger ship Nissos Mykonos while it was sailing in the eastern Aegean Sea between the islands of Ikaria and Samos. The vessel was operating its seasonal route from Piraeus to Samos, with 174 passengers and 74 crew members on board.

The fire originated in the vessel's funnel, releasing thick black smoke, but was successfully contained and extinguished by the crew. As a precautionary measure, five passengers suffering from smoke inhalation were evacuated from the ship for medical treatment. The remaining passengers were subsequently transferred to another ferry to complete their journey. While the exact extent of the damage was not initially disclosed, the Nissos Mykonos was diverted to Karlovasi, Samos, before being sent to Drapetsona for structural repairs.

==== 2021 collision (Ikaria) ====
On 11 February 2021, during the evening hours, Blue Star Myconos struck the pier at the port of Agios Kirykos during docking maneuvers, driven by adverse weather conditions in the area. The ship was operating its scheduled itinerary connecting Kavala, Myrina, Mytilene, Oinousses, Chios, Vathy, Karlovasi, Fournoi, Agios Kirykos, Mykonos, Syros, and Piraeus, with 164 passengers on board.

The impact caused a slight deformation of the bulbous bow. The ferry subsequently docked safely at the port, where all passengers and vehicles bound for Agios Kirykos disembarked without incident. No injuries or marine pollution were reported.

Following the presentation of a class maintenance certificate by its classification society, the Agios Kirykos Port Station cleared the vessel to depart for a single voyage to the port of Piraeus, with intermediate scheduled stops at the ports of Mykonos and Syros.
