= Karavostamo =

Village in Ikaria, Greece

Karavostamo Καραβόσταμο
- Community
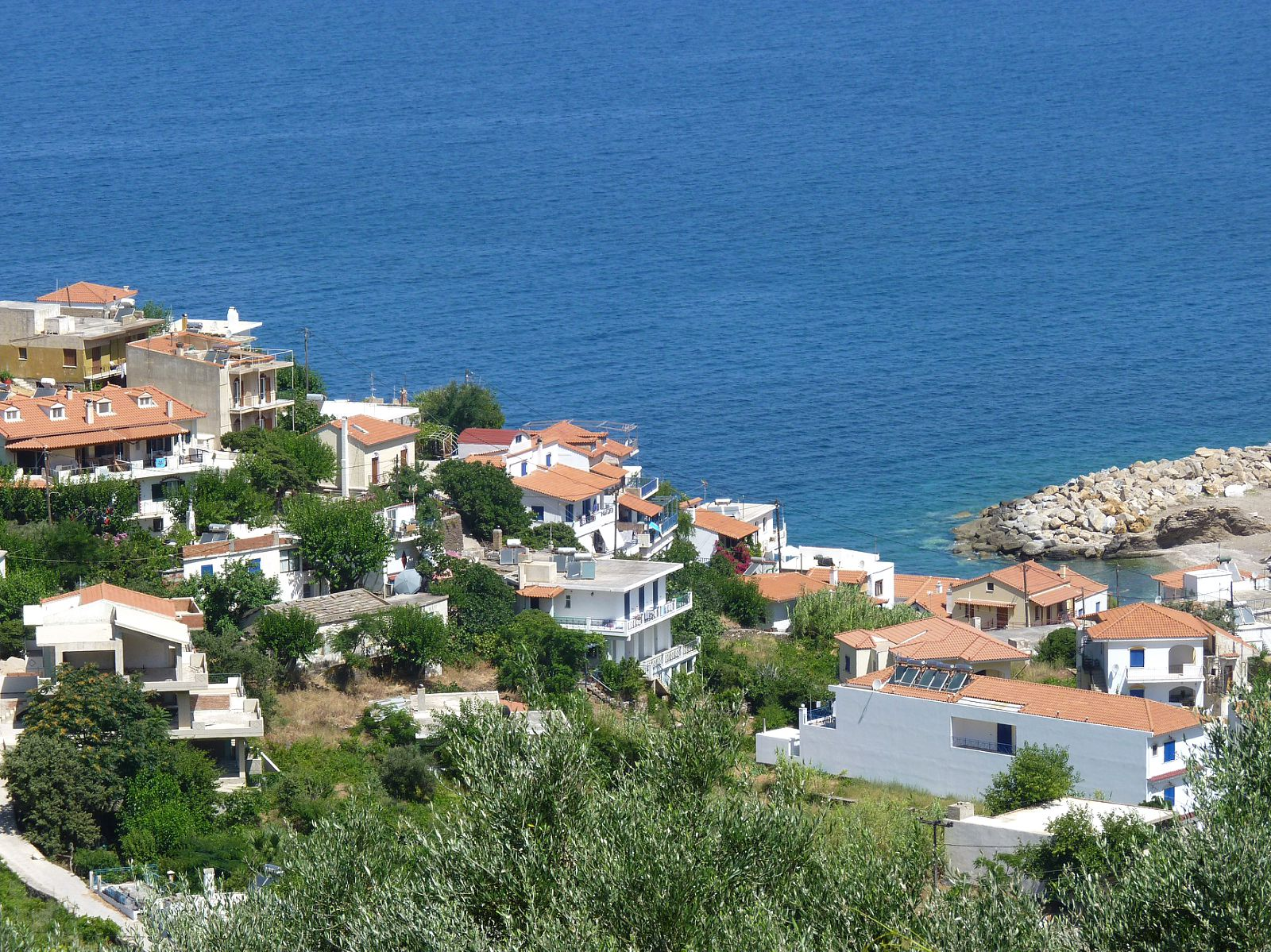
- Town Hillside

- Location within Greece
- Coordinates: 37°38′N 26°13′E
- Country: Greece
- Administrative region: North Aegean
- Regional unit: Ikaria
- Municipality: Ikaria
- Municipal unit: Evdilos

Population (2021)
  - Community: 503
- Time zone: UTC+2 (EET)
  - Summer (DST): UTC+3 (EEST)
- Vehicle registration: ΜΟ

Karavostamo (Greek: Καραβόσταμο) is a seaside village on the island of Ikaria, Greece. It is composed of an upper and lower village and is situated in the northern part of the island east of the municipal unit of Evdilos. It has 503 inhabitants (2021). It has small houses amphitheatrically built, two churches, several chapels, nursery, primary school, modern oil press, streams, old watermills, and beaches. The traditional "Pigi tou Halika," Halika Spring, stands just off the main road. Historically it was the central meeting place of the villagers, where they would fill their pitchers with water, wash their clothes, rest, and discuss village issues.

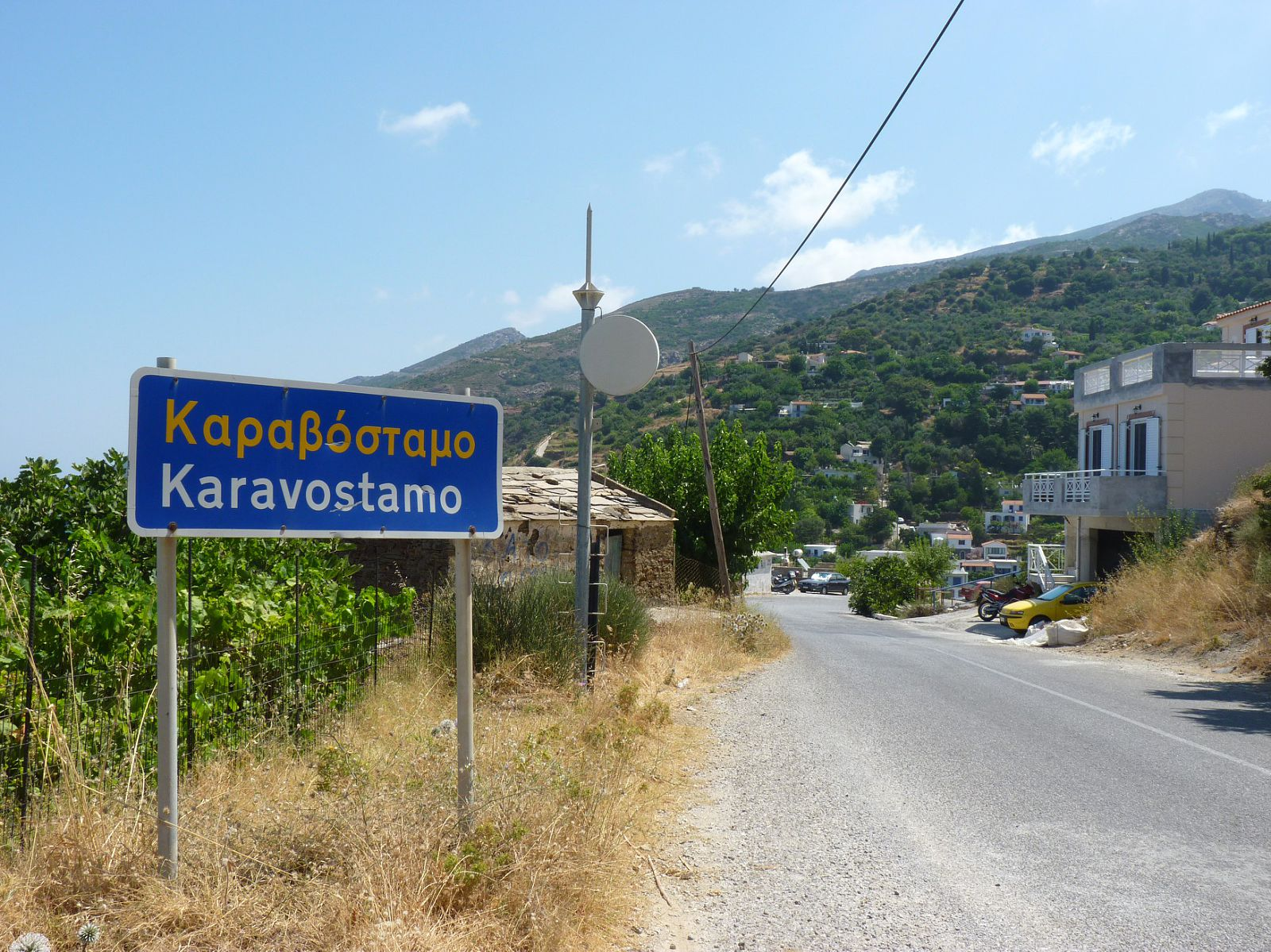
Karavostamo Road Sign

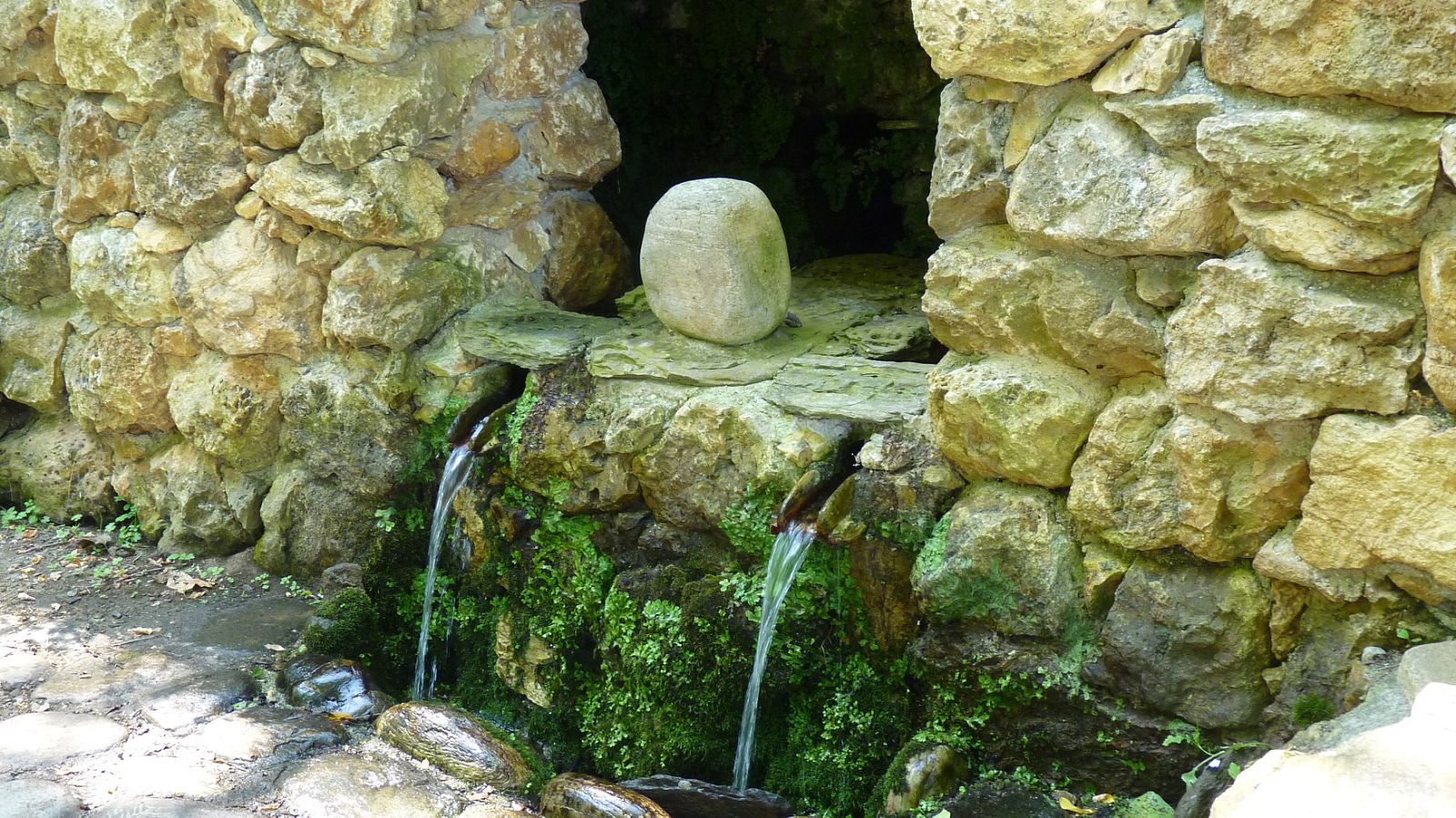
Halika

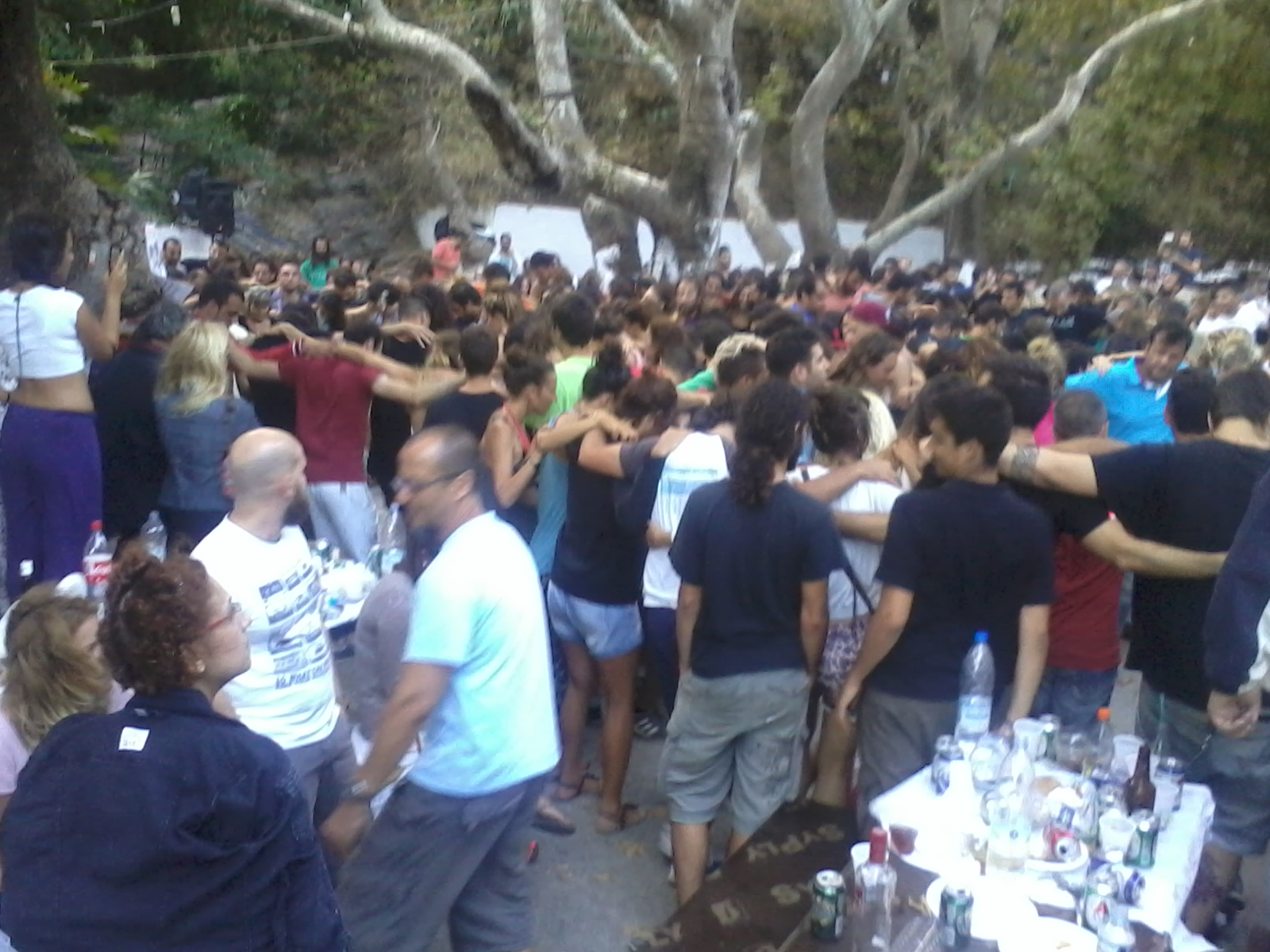
Ikarian festival (panigyri) at Karavostamo

In the upper village with the farm houses surrounded by terraces, some cultivated and some not, villagers dry figs in the sun, make onion strings for winter usage, and shell and dry nuts and almonds. There is also a "kamini" or place where charcoal is produced, one of the few still existing in Ikaria which has had a long-standing tradition in the field since before the Second World War.
