= HSC Aeolos Kenteris =

Passenger highspeed ship

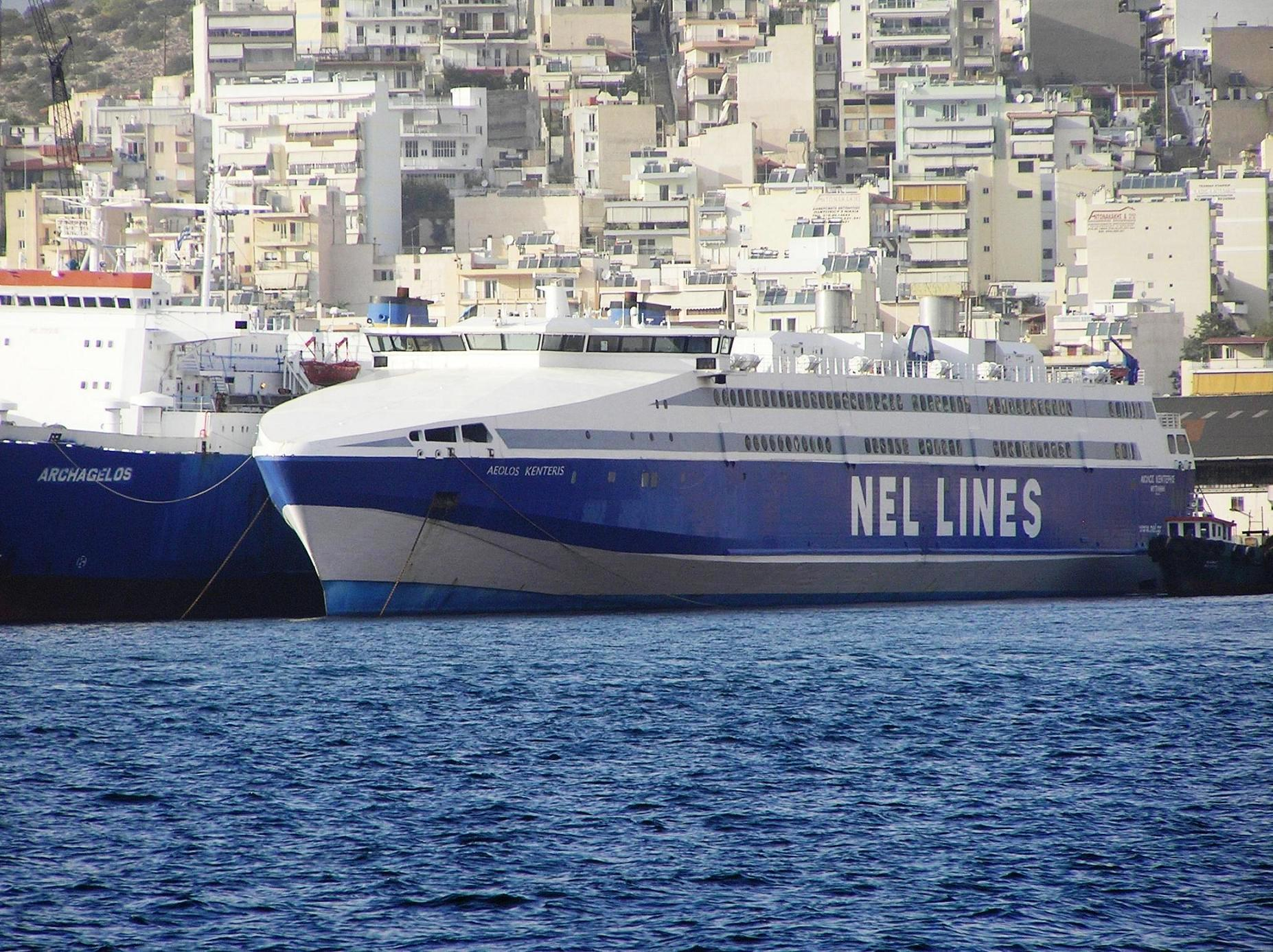
- Aeolos Kenteris laid up in Perama

History
- Name: Aeolos Kenteris (2001–2007, 2009–2026)
- Owner: NEL Lines
- Operator: NEL Lines
- Port of registry: Mytilene, Greece (2001–2026)
- Ordered: 2000
- Completed: 2001
- Acquired: 2001
- Maiden voyage: 2001
- In service: 2001
- Out of service: 2011
- Nickname(s): Aeolos, Konstantinos Kenteris
- Fate: Beached for scrapping in Aliaga, Turkey.
- Name: Red Sea I (2007–2009)
- Owner: Pictor Shipping
- Operator: Namma Lines
- Port of registry: Valletta, Malta; Panama, Panama
- Route: Safaga to Jeddah
- Acquired: 2007
- Maiden voyage: 2007
- In service: 2007
- Out of service: 2009
- Notes: Sold back to NEL Lines.

General characteristics
- Type: Ro-ro passenger ship
- Length: 140 m (459 ft 4 in)
- Draught: 5.3 m (17 ft 5 in)
- Speed: 36 knots (67 km/h; 41 mph)

HSC Aeolos Kenteris, was a passenger highspeed craft which was part of the fleet of the Lesvos Shipping Company (NEL) - NEL Lines. She was built in 2000 at Alstom Leroux Naval of France (subsidiary of Alstom). She could hold a total of 1742 passengers and 442 private vehicles. (124 cars and 38 trucks).She was powered by a CODAG propulsion plant, with a power of 66.2MW, two MTU GE LM2500 diesel engines with gas turbines, each with power 25,000 kW at 3,600 rpm, Renk BS 210 gearboxes and Kamewa 200 511 waterjets, which allowed her to reach speeds of up to 40 knots. Previously, she also had two Pielstick 20PA6B STC diesel engines with a power of 8,100 kW at 1,050 rpm. each. She had seats for economy and 1st class passengers, bar for economy and 1st class passengers, 127 satellite TVs, headphones with music in the seats, elevator for passengers, escalator, reception, Jewellery safekeeping room, telephone and toilets. She took its name from Aeolus, the mythical treasurer of the winds according to Greek Mythology, but also Costas Kenteris, a modern Greek runner.

The ship was laid-up from 2011 to 2016 in Selinia, Salamis. In 2016, after five years of laid-up, she was chartered to Italy, but never managed to be utilized. She was partially submerged at Augusta until she was refloated in 2026 and towed to Aliaga, Turkey for scrapping.

== History ==
The ship was built in 2000 at the French shipyard Alstom Leroux Naval S.A. She was one of the three "super-highspeed" passenger-vehicle ferries ordered by NEL. The other two were the Aeolos Express II (later Aeolos Kenteris II) and the Aeolos Express (Later Aeolos Kenteris I). Upon receipt, the ship became the flagship of the company and was then considered the fastest ship operating in the Aegean. She was launched on the Piraeus-Chios-Lesvos line. Although initially considered successful, the first problems, such as coastal damages and losses from wastewater and problems with Pielstick engines, began to appear. Although a French team came from France to repair them, the problems remained. Frequent accidents due to floods were the reason, even to warn the bathers of the beaches of Halkidiki and the Aegean for its crossing, while after a relevant complaint it was decided that when passing through beaches to move at a distance of 10 miles from them and with lower speed. In 2006, her engines were replaced, and so the ship, after receiving the nickname "Jewel of the Aegean", was launched on the Piraeus-Paros-Naxos-Santorini line.

In 2007 it was decided to sell her, together with the HSC Panagia Parou, to Pictor Shipping SA for $85 million, while they were chartered in the Red Sea by the same company, while the two remaining vessels "Aeolos Express" and "Aeolos Express II" received her name ("Aeolos Kenteris I" and "Aeolos Kenteris II" respectively.). The ship was renamed Red Sea I and sailed on the Safaga-Jeddah route, managed by Namma Lines, connecting Egypt with Saudi Arabia.

In 2016, while she had already returned to Greece and reverted to her original name, the ship was chartered to Italy, in order to connect Augusta with Valletta, Malta. Renovation work began there, but it was delayed, resulting for the ship to be seized for debts of 5,000,000 euros. She eventually flooded and was partially submerged in Augusta, Italy unitl she was refloated in 2026 and towed for scrapping in Aliaga, Turkey.
