= MS Lene =

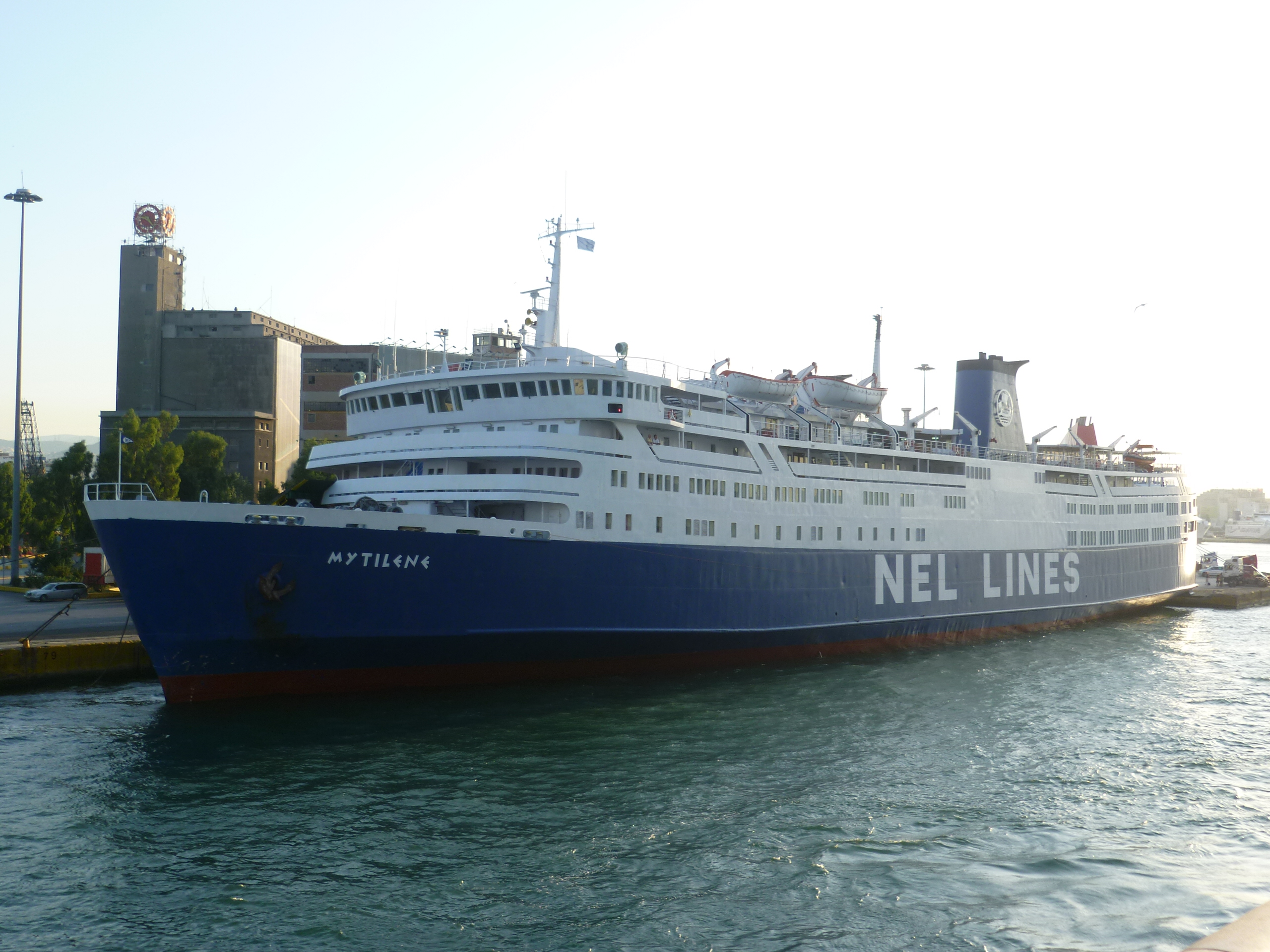
- Mytilene at Piraeus in 2011.

History

Japan
- Name: Vega
- Owner: Shin Higashi Nihon Ferry
- Route: Tomakomai to Sendai
- Launched: 3 August 1973
- Completed: 1973
- Acquired: 1973
- Maiden voyage: 1973
- In service: 1973
- Out of service: 1986
- Fate: Sold
- Name: Mytilene (1992–2022); Lene (2022–2022)
- Namesake: Mytilene
- Owner: NEL Lines (1992–2019); ANEN LINES (2019–2022)
- Operator: NEL Lines (1992–2015)
- Port of registry: Chios, Greece (1992–2019); Togo (2019–2022)
- Route: Piraeus to Chios and Mytilene (until 2015)
- Acquired: 1990
- Maiden voyage: 1992
- In service: 1992
- Out of service: February 2015
- Identification: IMO number: 7332672; MMSI number: 237614000; Callsign: SYMK
- Fate: Scrapped at Aliağa, Turkey in 2022.

General characteristics
- Type: Ro-Ro/Passenger ship
- Tonnage: 9,124 GT; 2,323 DWT
- Length: 136.71 metres (448.5 ft)
- Draught: 5.5 metres (18 ft)
- Speed: 20 knots
- Notes: Oldest active NEL Lines ship until 2015

MS Mytilene was a ferry ship of Greece, which used to be part of NEL Lines' fleet. She was built in 1973 in Japan as the Vega and put into service for NEL in 1992. She is a sister ship of Virgo, which also came to Greece as the GA Ferries' Rodanthi. She could accommodate up to 1300 passengers and 225 vehicles. The shipis powered by two Pielstick 16PC2-5V diesel engines with a maximum combined power of 19,200 bhp and reached service speeds up to 21 knots and maximum speed up to 23.8. She had economy class seating, a salon and bar for A and economy class passengers, a self service restaurant, dining room, jewellery safekeeping room, telephone and gift shop. She took her name from Mytilene, the largest city and capital of Lesvos.

The ship has been laid up since 2015, initially in Karlovasi, Samos and later in Elefsina. The ship will be difficult to return to operating condition, due to engine failure and her company declaring bankruptcy. In 2020, the ship was bought by ANEN at auction and raised the Togolese flag. In 2022 she was sold for scrap as Lene and on 1 June 2022 she was beached for scrap at Aliağa, Turkey.

== History ==
=== 1973-2010: First years ===
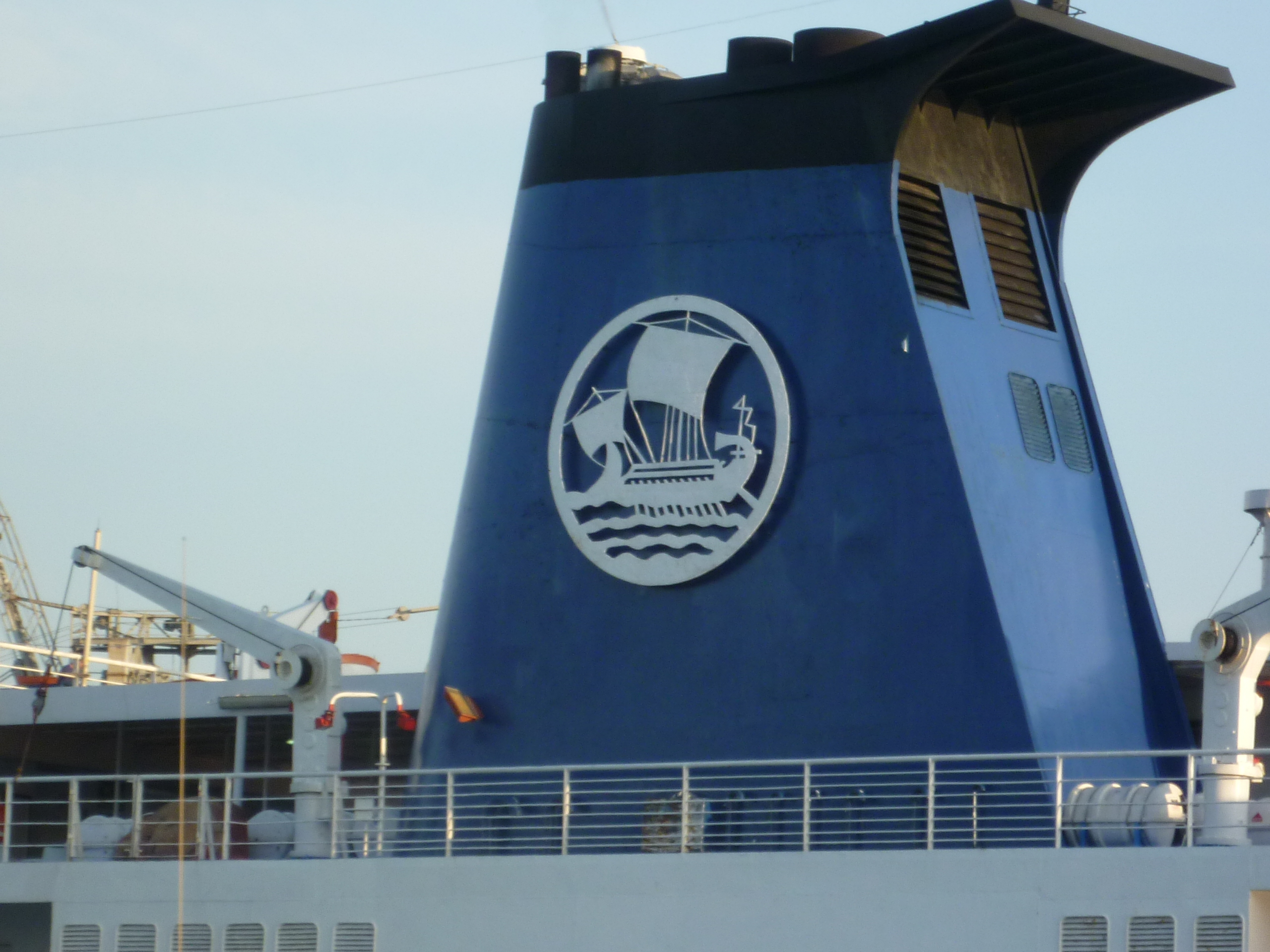
Ship's funnel with NEL logo, 2011.

The ship was built in 1973 in Japan and was originally named Vega, after the star in the constellation Lyra for Shin Higashi Nihon Ferry, a subsidiary of Higashi Nihon Ferry. The ship operated on the Tomakomai-Sendai route until 1986. In 1990, she was sold to the Lesvos Shipping Company (NEL) and renamed Mytilene, from the city of the same name. In 1991, a conversion to night ferry began, which lasted about a year. It was routed between Piraeus-Chios-Mytilene and Lemnos-Kavala-Thessaloniki, while she was also used on the Kavala-Lemnos-Chios-Mytilene-Samos-Ikaria line occasionally. Initially, she was white, with blue lettering on the sides, but later became blue with white lettering, as was the custom with other ships of the company.

=== 2013-2022 ===
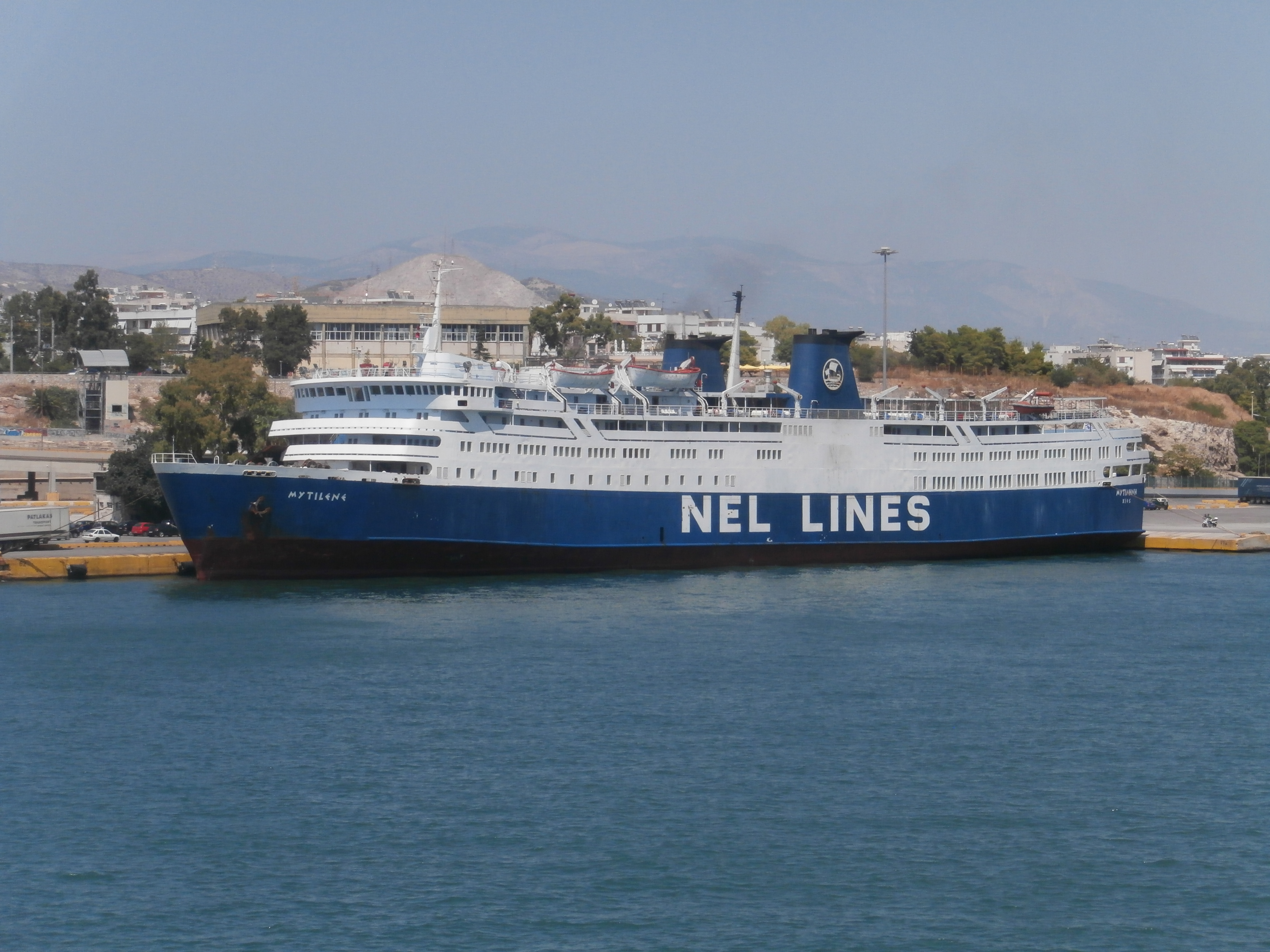
Mytilene at Piraeus.

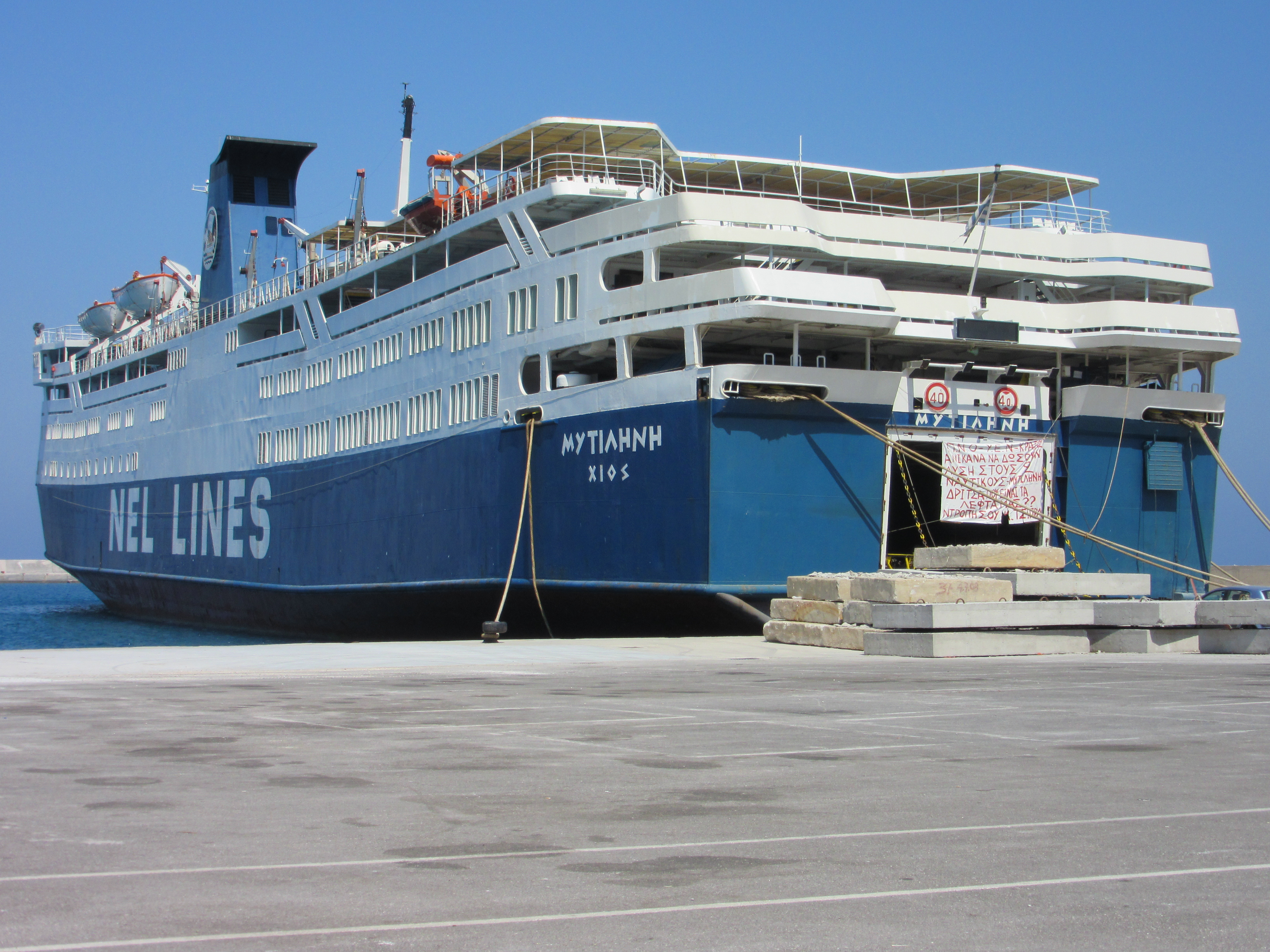
Mytilene at Karlovasi in 2015.

In 2013, she was transferred to the line Piraeus-Syros-Evdilos-Agios Kyrikos-Fourni-Karlovasi-Vathi. There, she operated for two years, until February 2015, when due to an accident, she was stuck in Karlovasi. The 43 sailors of the ship were placed under protection by decision of the Deputy Minister of Shipping, due to non-fulfillment of obligations by the ship owner for salaries. Their salaries were finally paid. There were also rumors, later refuted, that the ship would be used as a floating hotel. Finally, after 17 months, and after a relevant auction for her sale by the Municipal Port Fund of Samos, was moved from Karlovasi by a tug and transported to Elefsina. There, another auction followed for her sale, and she was eventually bought by ANEN and hoisted the Togolese flag. In 2022 she was sold for scrap as Lene and on 1 June 2022 she was beached for scrap in Aliağa, Turkey.
