= MS Arion (1964) =

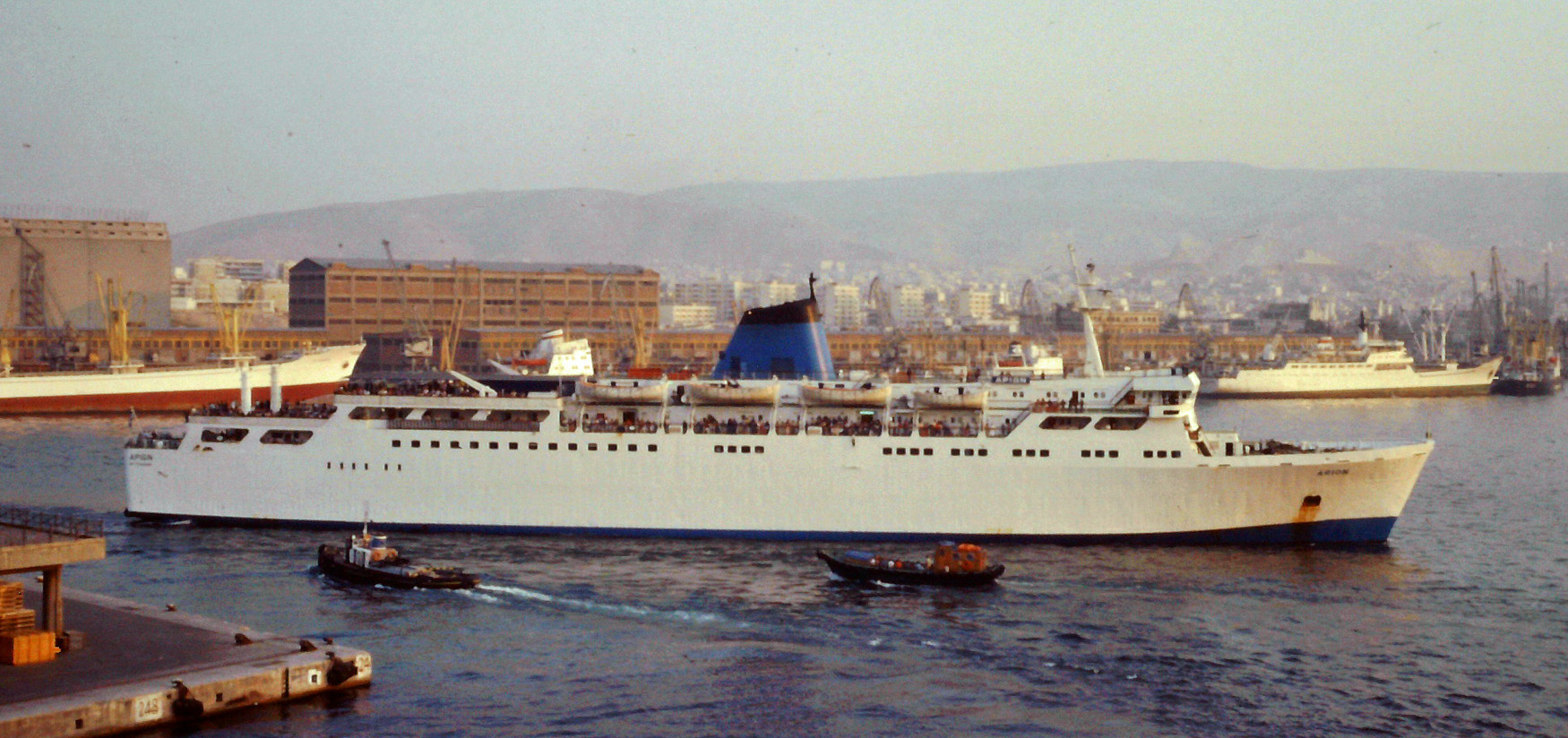
- Arion at Piraeus on August 1, 1978.

History

Israel
- Name: Nili
- Builder: Fairfield Shipbuilding & Engineering Ltd., Glasgow
- Launched: 11 August 1964
- Completed: 1965
- Maiden voyage: 1965
- In service: 1965
- Out of service: 1975
- Renamed: Jamaica Queen; Nili
- Fate: Sold to Greece

Greece
- Name: Arion
- Namesake: Arion
- Owner: NEL Lines
- Operator: NEL Lines
- Port of registry: Greece, Mytilene
- Maiden voyage: 7 November 1975
- In service: 1975
- Out of service: 1981
- Identification: IMO number: 6420214
- Fate: Destroyed by fire in 1981, then scrapped

General characteristics
- Type: Ro-Pax
- Tonnage: 7,851 GRT
- Length: 449 ft (137 m)
- Installed power: 2 × diesel engines, 11,000 horsepower (8,200 kW)
- Speed: 20 knots (37 km/h; 23 mph)
- Capacity: 1,000 passengers, >100 vehicles

The MS Arion was a passenger car ferry, which was part of the NEL Lines fleet. She was built in 1965 in Glasgow, United Kingdom and was put into operation by NEL in 1975 (She also operated in the past, under different names and owners). She took her name from Arion, a lyric poet from Mithymna (Molyvos) of Lesvos.

The ship initially operated in Israel as the Nili and later as the Helsinki Express on the Baltic Sea. Later, as the Jamaica Queen, she sailed in the Caribbean as a cruise ship. She came to Greece in 1975 and received her final name. The ship was destroyed in 1981 by a bomb blast in Haifa, Israel. She was towed out of port and burned completely. Finally, she was sold for scrap in 1984.

== Facilities ==
Arion had lounges, swimming pool, night club and double-bed cabins with bathrooms.

== History ==
=== 1960s, construction and first years ===
The ship was launched on 11 August 1964 and completed in June 1965 and originally operated in Haifa, before being renamed Helsinki Express and launched in the Baltic. Then (1966), she became Queen of Jamaica and set sail for the Caribbean for cruises, under the Pan American Cruise Lines. Finally, in 1969, she returned to the Mediterranean and returned to her original name.

=== 1970s and coming to Greece ===
In 1975, she was bought by the Lesvos Shipping Company and renamed Arion, for $2.95, while on 7 November she made her maiden voyage to Mytilene, with captain Giannis Kaldis.

"This ship does not belong to a shipowner or to any shipping company She belongs to the inhabitants of an entire island, to the inhabitants of Mytilene… »

— Report of ERT

Immediately, she was launched on the line Piraeus-Chios-Mytilene-Thessaloniki, while she also secured the line Piraeus-Rhodes-Limassol-Haifa, thus connecting Greece with Cyprus and Israel. The company advertised her as "The Floating Hotel".

=== 1980s and fate ===
On 20 December, while sailing off Haifa, Arion was attacked by terrorists. A bomb exploded in the hands of Coast Guard bosun Stavros Goumas, who was killed, while the ship caught fire. This attack was never clarified and the individuals or the organization that carried it out were never clarified. The prevailing view is that the Israeli Mossad secret service blew up the ship, in order to avoid any help to the Palestinians. No other casualties were reported, as the crew managed to dock her in Haifa, disembarking all passengers. The fire brigade, however, failed to control the fire, so the ship burned completely. For almost three years she laid-up in Israel, with the fire extinguished on its own, and the ship was transported to Eleusis. The ship was never repaired, and was eventually sold in Barcelona, Spain for scrap. NEL replaced her with a similar ship, the Odysseas Elytis, which, however, was not considered as successful as the Arion.
