= Blue Star Chios =

Greek Ropax Ferry

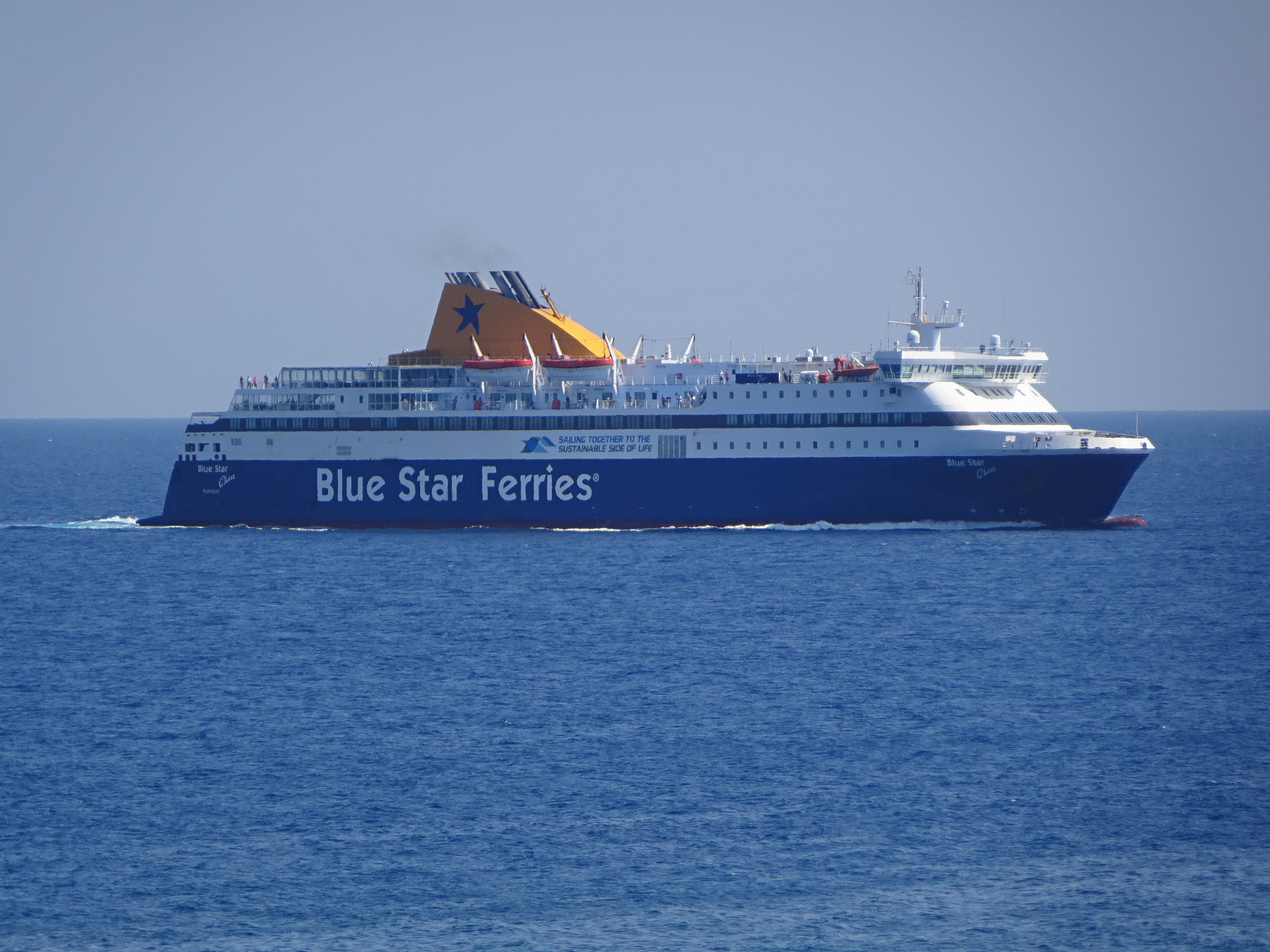
- Blue Star Chios at Rhodes

History

Greece
- Name: 2007–2020: Nissos Chios; 2020 onwards: Blue Star Chios
- Namesake: Island of Chios
- Owner: Blue Star Ferries
- Port of registry: Piraeus, Greece
- Route: Piraeus- Kalymnos - Kos - Rhodes & Ikaria (Ag. Kirykos) - Fourni - Astypalea - Patmos - Lipsi - Leros - Nisyros - Tilos - Symi - Karpathos - Kasos - Kastellorizo
- Ordered: 1 January 1999
- Builder: Elefsis Shipyards
- Yard number: 1702
- Laid down: 21 March 2006
- Launched: 15 November 2006
- Completed: 18 July 2007
- Identification: Call sign: SXXL; IMO number: 9215555; MMSI number: 240672000
- Status: In service

General characteristics
- Type: Ro-pax ferry
- Tonnage: 8,126 GT1,960 DWT
- Length: 141 m (463 ft)
- Beam: 21 m (69 ft)
- Depth: 7.5 m (25 ft)
- Installed power: Four diesel engines, 31,680 kW (combined)
- Propulsion: Two shafts; controllable pitch propellers
- Capacity: 1,715 passengers; 418 cars
- Crew: 76

Blue Star Chios (Greek: Μπλού Στάρ Χίος), formerly Nissos Chios (Greek: Νήσος Χίος), is a high-speed ro-pax ferry of Blue Star Ferries, built, along with its sister ship Blue Star Myconos, at Elefsis Shipyards. It was an old wish of Gerasimos Strintzis. In February 2006 the first pieces of the ship were loaded at Skararamangas and were transported to Elefsis Shipyards and on November 15, 2006, construction was launched at Elefsis Shipyards. It was delivered in June 2007 for Hellenic Seaways. Its construction was completed in a very short time.

The original name of the ship means in Greek "Island of Chios", which is one of the islands of the North Aegean. It was, when launched, the newest Greek ship with frequent travels. In January 2020, the Nissos Chios was renamed Blue Star Chios together with its sister ship Nissos Mykonos, which was renamed Blue Star Myconos, after the ships changed service from Hellenic Seaways to Blue Star Ferries.

There was a 1967-built Greek passenger-car ferry with the same name. The old Nissos Chios was scrapped in 2006.

== Routes ==
As of 2026, the ship has been serving the Piraeus- Santorini - Anafi - Kasos - Karpathos- Diafani - Chalki - Rhodes and back. In the past, it served routes such as Piraeus-Chios-Mytilene.
