= Raches =

Village in Ikaria, Greece

Raches Ράχες
- Municipal unit
- Location within the regional unit

- Location within Greece
- Coordinates: 37°36′N 26°05′E
- Country: Greece
- Administrative region: North Aegean
- Regional unit: Ikaria
- Municipality: Ikaria

Area
  - Municipal unit: 101.8 km^{2} (39.3 sq mi)

Population (2021)
  - Municipal unit: 2,282
  - Municipal unit density: 22.42/km^{2} (58.06/sq mi)
  - Community: 1,194
- Time zone: UTC+2 (EET)
  - Summer (DST): UTC+3 (EEST)
- Area code: 22750
- Vehicle registration: ΜΟ

Raches (Greek: Ράχες) is a village and a former municipality on the island of Ikaria, North Aegean, Greece. Since the 2011 local government reform it is part of the municipality Ikaria, of which it is a municipal unit. With a population of 2,282 inhabitants (2021 census) and a land area of 101.768 km^{2}, it is the largest in area, smallest in population, and therefore the least densely populated of the three municipal units on Icaria. The other two municipal units are Agios Kirykos and Evdilos.
