= Aspasia T =

Passenger ferry

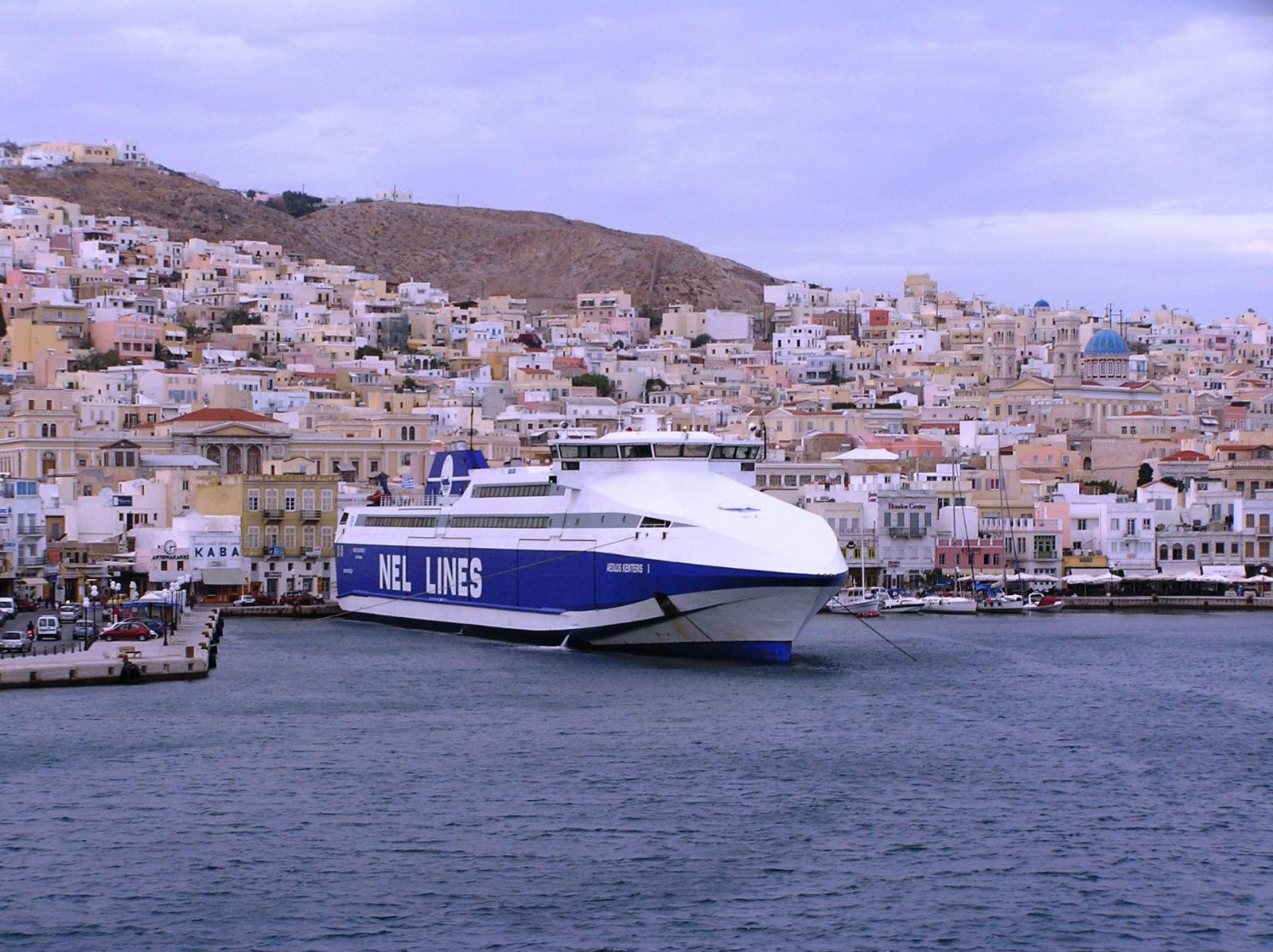
- Aspasia T as Aeolos Kenteris I in Syros

History

Greece
- Name: Aeolos Express (2000–2007); Aeolos Kenteris I (2007–2010) (2010–2022); Aspasia T (2022–present)
- Owner: NEL Lines (2000–2019); ANEN Lines (2019–present)
- Operator: NEL Lines
- Port of registry: Mytilene, Greece (2000–2010) (2010–2022); Togo (2022–present)
- Completed: 2000
- Maiden voyage: 2000
- In service: 2000
- Out of service: 2011
- Fate: Sold

France
- Name: NGV Liamone
- Owner: NEL Lines
- Route: Corsica to Nice
- Acquired: 2010
- In service: 2010
- Out of service: 2010
- Identification: MMSI number: 239678000; IMO number: 9210103; Call sign: SYDK
- Fate: Laid up, then sold at an auction.

General characteristics
- Type: Ro-ro passenger ship
- Tonnage: 6,177 GT; 1,853 DWT
- Length: 112.2 m (368 ft 1 in)
- Draught: 4 m (13 ft 1 in)
- Speed: 36 knots (67 km/h; 41 mph)

Aspasia T, is an inactive (as of 2025) passenger ferry speedboat, which was part of the fleet of the Lesvos Shipping Company (NEL) - NEL Lines. She was built in 2000 at Alstom Leroux Naval S.A. of France as the Aeolos Express. She could hold a total of up to 1,000 passengers and 210 vehicles (146 I.X. and 12 trucks) and was powered by four Pielstick diesel engines with a combined 32,400 kilowatts (43,400 hp) and reached speeds of up to 36 knots (67 km/h; 41 mph). She had Pullman seats for people of economy and 1st class passengers, economy and 1st class bar, 127 satellite TVs, headsets for music in the seats, elevator for passengers, escalator staircase, reception, a jewellery safekeeping room, telephone and toilets for disabled, and was fully-airconditioned. She took her name from Aeolus, the mythical treasurer of the winds according to Greek mythology, but also Costas Kenteris, a modern Greek runner.

She was the first Greek monohull passenger highspeed craft. The ship has been laid up in Selinina, Salamina, since 2011. The ship will be very difficult to return to operating condition, due to the dissolution of NEL. In 2019, the ship was purchased by ANEN, but it remains unknown if she will return to service.

== History ==
The ship was built in 2000 at the French shipyard Alsthom Leroux Naval S.A. as Aeolos Express. She was the first of three passenger-vehicle "super-highspeed" ferries ordered by NEL and belonged to the Corsaire 12000 type. The other two were the Aeolos Express II (later Aeolos Kenteris II) and the HSC Aeolos Kenteris.

In her early years, she faced reliability problems due to problems with Pielstick diesel engines, which caused the company's name to be shaken, something to which both delays and minor problems also contributed. Although a team of engineers from France came to Greece to repair them, the problem remained. On September 15, 2006, the company announced that it was reaching a settlement with SEMT Pielstick, "after almost a year of litigation in French courts". Thus, the propulsion machines were restored and upgraded, a two-year guarantee of the mechanical parts was introduced and immediate payment to NEL Lines of the amount of 10 million euros.

On September 28, 2007, the sale of Aeolos Kenteris was announced, and thus the two highspeed crafts Aeolos Express and Aeolus Express II were renamed Aeolos Kenteris I and Aeolos Kenteris II respectively, in her honor. After the renaming, Aeolos Kenteris I was launched on the line Piraeus-Rethymnon.

From March to October 2010, she was chartered by the French SNCM, as the NGV Liamone II, for routes between Nice and Corsica.

In 2011, after 11 years of operation, she was laid-up in a carnagio in Selinia, Salamina. On November 20, 2019, and after many fruitless auctions, the ship was bought at an auction by ANEN with a price of 2.02 million euros and a first bid price of 2 million euros. She was finally registered within the company a year later.
