= Maritime Company of Lesvos =

Ferry companies of Greece

Maritime Company of Lesvos S.A.
- Type: Passenger ferry company
- Founded: 1972
- Defunct: 2015
- Fate: Bankruptcy
- Successor: Blue Star Ferries Hellenic Seaways
- Headquarters: Mytilene, Greece
- Footnotes; Bankruptcy in 2015

NEL Lines (Greek: Ναυτιλιακή Εταιρία Λέσβου, Naftiliaki Eteria Lesvou) was established in 1972, as a community-based company with shareholders from the island of Lesvos, Greece and the primary aim of acquiring a liner vessel for the Mytilene-Chios-Piraeus route. Over the years, the company expanded, serving many Aegean sea destinations.

Operating high-speed and conventional passenger-ferry boats, NEL sailed on intra-Cyladic itineraries connecting Syros and Lavrio with Eastern, Central and Western Cyclades, Lavrio with Psara and Mesta of Chios, Heraklion and Rethymno with Santorini and Thessaloniki and Volos with the Sporades archipelago.

With passenger-ferry boats NEL also sailed between Piraeus, Chios and Mitilini and connected the islands of Northern Aegean with Thessaloniki, Kavala and Lavrio.

In 2015 Nel Lines declared bankruptcy and ceased operations, citing the financial crises and losing subsidized routes rival to rival operators.

== Former fleet ==
- Sappho (1973-2002) scrapped as Santori in Alang, India in 2004
- Arion (1975-1981) When the ship was in Haifa with 250 passengers on board, a bomb exploded on board. The ship was towed out and sunk outside the harbor in 1981. It was then towed and laid-up in Elefsina and later sold for scrap in Barcelona, Spain
- Homerus (1977-1993) scrapped as Veesham IX in Alang, India in 2003.
- Alcaeos (1981-2002) scrapped as Sochi Express in Aliağa, Turkey in 2004.
- Odysseas Elytis (1982-1985) scrapped as Safa in Alang, India in 2005.
- Agios Rafael (1989-2001) sank in 2013 near China when she went for scrapping.
- Mytilene (1990-2015) Laid up from 2015 to 2022. Sold for scrap as Lene in Aliağa, Turkey in 2022.
- Theofilos (1995-2015) Laid up from 2015 to 2022. Sold for scrap as Ilos in Aliağa, Turkey in 2022.
- Taxiarchis (1999-2015) laid-up in Lavrio from 2015 to 2018. Laid-up in Salamis since 2018. Sold for scrap in September 2023.
- Aeolos Kenteris I (2000-2011) laid-up in Salamis since 2011. Sold to Anen Lines in 2019 and renamed Aspasia T in 2022.
- Aeolos Kenteris II (2001-2011) laid-up in Salamis since 2011.
- Aeolos Kenteris (2001-2011) partially sunk in Augusta, Italy since 2018.
- Panagia Tinou (2007-2009) caught up fire in Tripoli, Lebanon in 2016 and sold for scrap in Aliağa, Turkey in 2016.
- Panagia Hozoviotissa (2007-2010) scrapped in Aliağa, Turkey in 2010.
- Panagia Thalassini (2007-2015) sold to Idomeneas Lines as Kalli P but is laid-up in Perama since 2015.
- Panagia Parou (2007-2018) partially sank in Algeciras port in 2017, towed up and went for scrap in Aliağa, Turkey in 2018.
- Aqua Jewel (2010-2014) as Aqua Jewel for Seajets since 2017.
- European Express (2010-2019) scrapped as Express in Aliağa, Turkey in 2019.
- Colossus (2010-2013) scrapped in Alang, India in 2013.
- Mykonos (2010-2013) as Talos for Creta Cargo Lines since 2014.
- Alkioni (2010-2019) as Cat I for Magic Sea Ferries since 2019.
- Ippotis (2010-2014) scrapped in Aliağa, Turkey in 2014.
- Cyclades Express (2010-2016) as Naxos Jet for Seajets since 2016.
- Aqua Maria (2010-2016) laid-up in Drapetsona as Alexandra L since 2019.
- Olympus (2010-2017) Scrapped in Alang, India in 2017.
- Aqua Hercules (2010-2017) partially sank in Iskenderun since 2021.
- Aqua Spirit (2010-2015) as Northern Sea Wolf for BC Ferries since 2017.
- Ionian Sky (2013-2020) scrapped in Aliağa, Turkey in 2020.
