= Agios Kirykos =

Town in Ikaria, Greece

Agios Kirykos Άγιος Κήρυκος
- Municipal unit
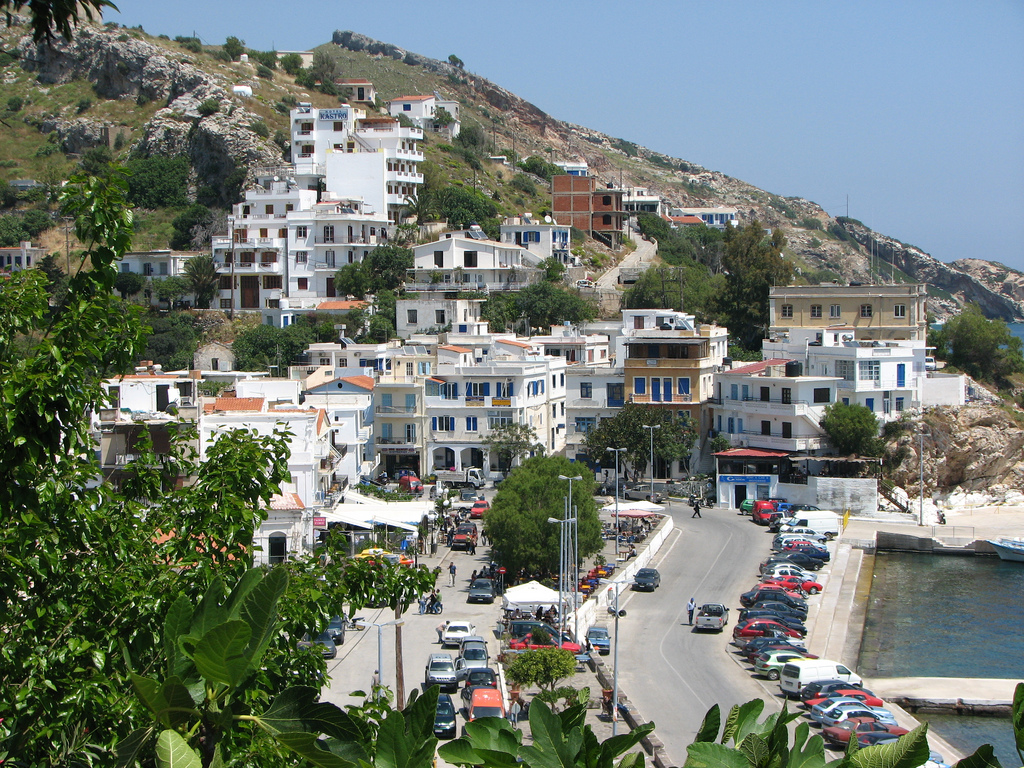
- View of the port

- Location within the regional unit

- Location within Greece
- Coordinates: 37°37′N 26°18′E
- Country: Greece
- Administrative region: North Aegean
- Regional unit: Ikaria
- Municipality: Ikaria

Area
  - Municipal unit: 74.7 km^{2} (28.8 sq mi)

Population (2021)
  - Municipal unit: 3,565
  - Municipal unit density: 47.7/km^{2} (124/sq mi)
  - Community: 2,958
- Time zone: UTC+2 (EET)
  - Summer (DST): UTC+3 (EEST)
- Vehicle registration: ΜΟ

Agios Kirykos (Greek: Άγιος Κήρυκος) is a town and a former municipality on the island of Ikaria, North Aegean, Greece. Since the 2011 local government reform it is part of the municipality Ikaria, of which it is a municipal unit. Its population was 3,565 at the 2021 census (2,958 for the town itself), and its land area is 74.7 square kilometres (28.8 square miles). It is the administrative capital of Ikaria and the Ikaria regional unit (which includes the islands of Fourni).

The municipal unit shares the island of Ikaria with the municipal units of Evdilos and Raches; of the three, it is the largest in population and smallest in land area.

It was named after Saint Kirykos or Quiricus, the youngest martyr of the Eastern Orthodox Church, who suffered death at the age of three in Asia Minor. To him is devoted the cathedral church of the town. Agios Kirykos hosts the annual International Chess Tournament, "Ikaros", every July.

Points of interest include the old school, the archaeological museum, the traditional square, the brass band performing at feast days since 1928, the stadium in Patela, which hosted the 10th Pan-Aegean Games, the statue of Skepsi (thinking woman), the altar of the flame for the Aerathletic international IKARIADA Games and the Lefkada Annunciation medieval monastery. The Archaeological Museum of Agios Kirykos houses various relics from an ancient tower outpost on a nearby mountain. These relics range from pottery shards to jewelry to arrow heads. Prior to 2010, the building functioned as the town’s high school before being repurposed into a museum. Another addition made to the town is the breakwater. Made of massive tetrapods, this structure was installed to protect the town from the infamous waves during winter. During winter, the weather in the town completely changes. There are constant storms that pelt against the town. The waves are too rough to swim in and many locals spend most time in doors. While snow hits in the mountains, it very rarely gets to Agios Kirykos. The storms are also the reason why no sand forms on the beach as it is swept away from the water. This leaves only rocky beaches in Agios Kirykos. This weather is drastically different to the sunny, summer months when clear skies dominate the days. In summer, the water is usually calm and it hardly ever rains.

Agios Kirykos is located twenty five minutes from the airport, five minutes away from Therma, and about an hour away from Evdilos. Agios Kiryoshosts a variety of places to visit. the center of the town lies the plateia. Similar to a town square, many restaurants and public buildings surround the plateia. The plateia is most active during 10:00 a.m. to 1:00 p.m. when most residents get up for their day. After lunch most locals take a nap, and the plateia receives a surge of visitors later at around 8:00 p.m. to 11:00 p.m. Not only are residents having dinner, but it's common for younger locals to come out at this time to socialize before heading over to WaWa, the town's club. Bars are open late in Agios Kirykos, and often do not close until 5 a.m.
