= Fournoi Korseon =

Archipelago of small Greek islands in the North Aegean region, Greece

Fournoi Korseon Φούρνοι Κορσεών
- Municipality
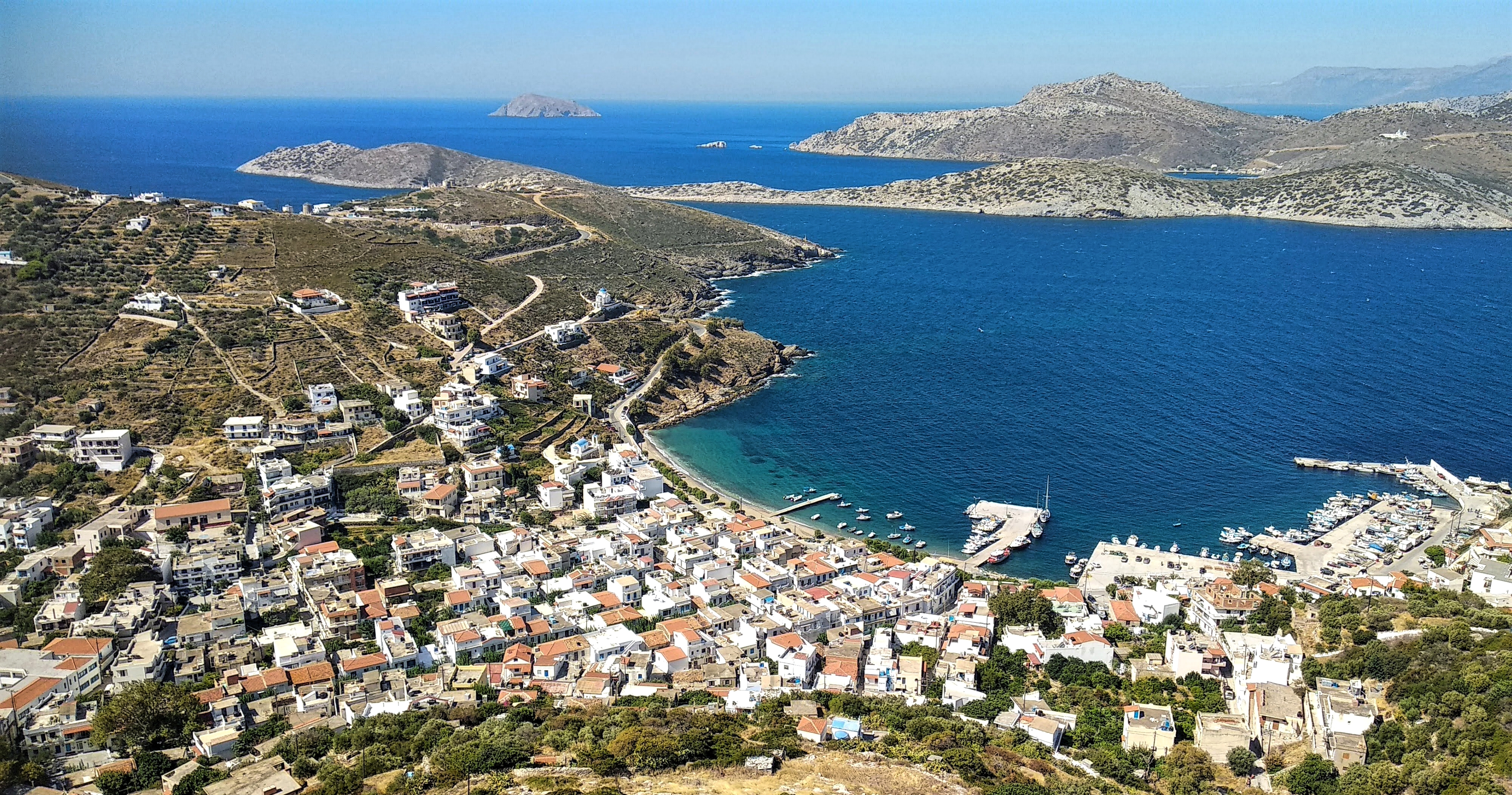
- Fournoi Korseon

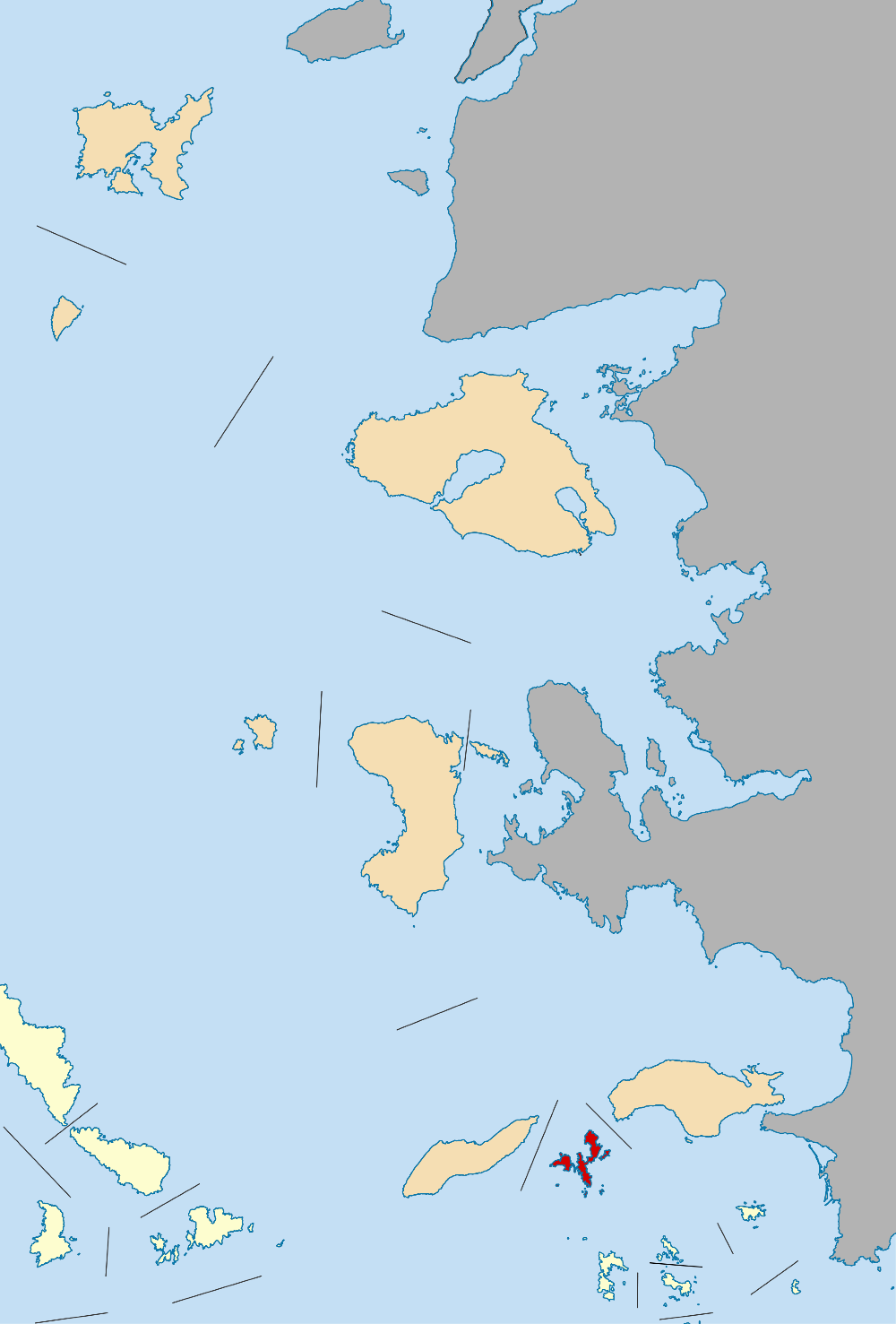

- Location within Greece
- Coordinates: 37°34′N 26°30′E
- Country: Greece
- Administrative region: North Aegean
- Regional unit: Ikaria

Area
  - Municipality: 45.247 km^{2} (17.470 sq mi)

Population (2021)
  - Municipality: 1,343
  - Density: 29.68/km^{2} (76.87/sq mi)
- Time zone: UTC+2 (EET)
  - Summer (DST): UTC+3 (EEST)
- Postal code: 833 xx
- Area code: 22750
- Vehicle registration: MO
- Website: www.fournikorseon.gr

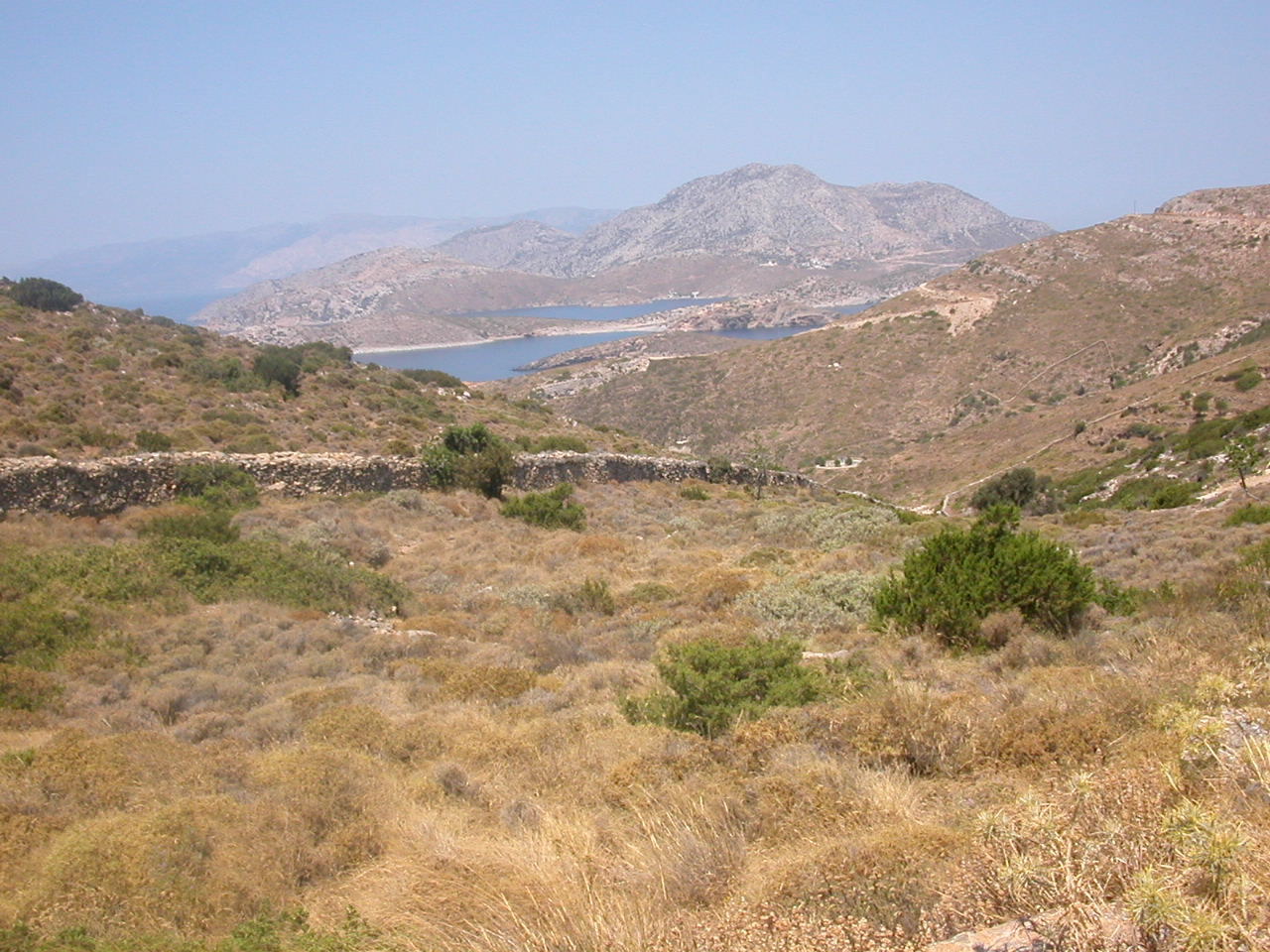
Looking from Fourni Island to Thymaina and Icaria

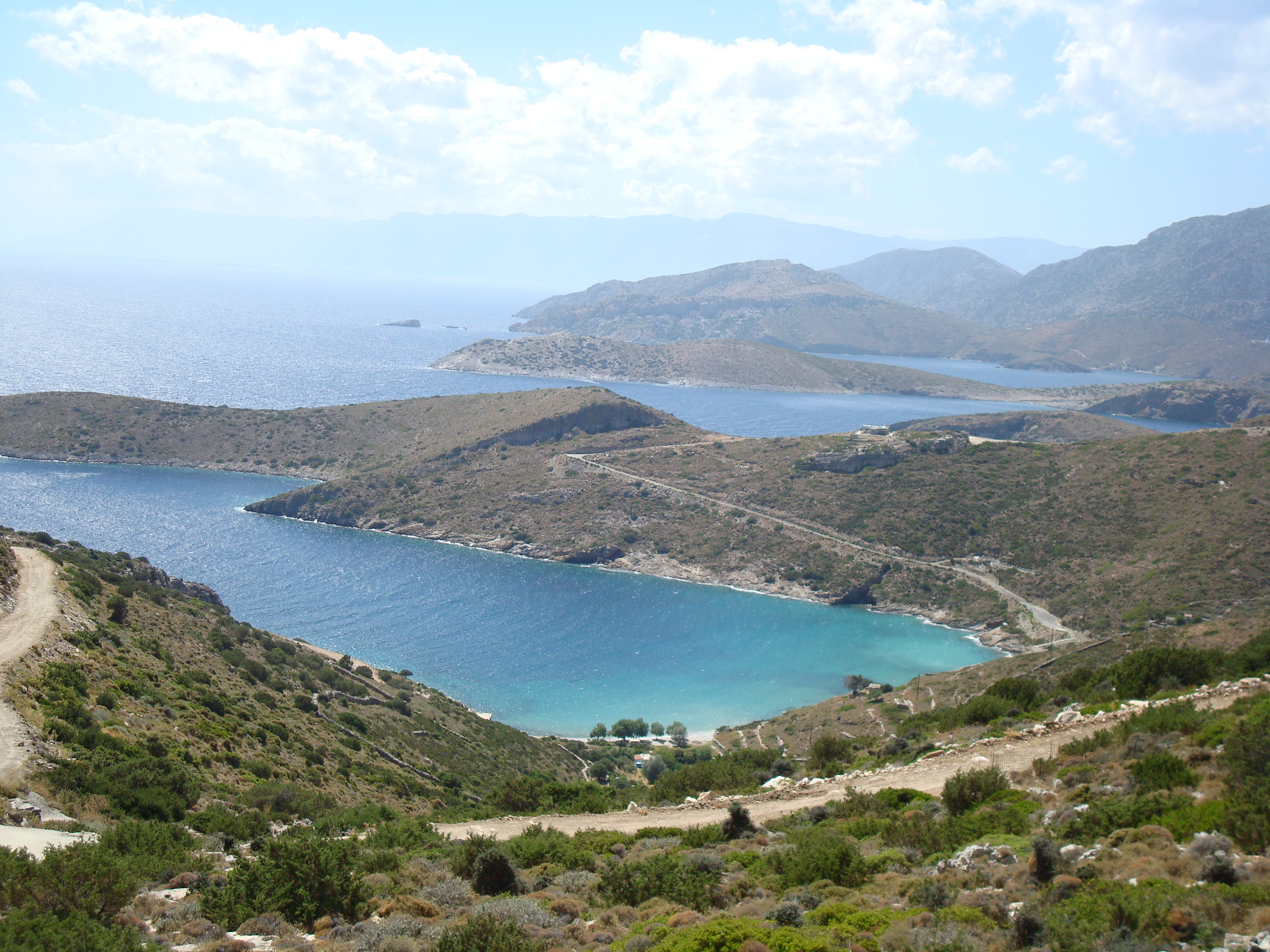
Overview

Fournoi Korseon (Greek: Φούρνοι Κορσεών), more commonly simplified as Fournoi (Greek: Φούρνοι), anciently known as Corsiae or Korsiai (Ancient Greek: Κορσίαι), Corseae or Korseai (Κορσεαί), Corsia or Korsia (Κορσία), and Corassiae (Κορασσίαι), form a complex or archipelago of small Greek islands that lie between Ikaria, Samos and Patmos in Ikaria regional unit, North Aegean region. The two largest islands of the complex, the main isle of Fournoi 31 square kilometres (12 square miles) and the isle of Thymaina 10 square kilometres (3.9 square miles), are inhabited, as is Agios Minas Island 2.3 square kilometres (0.9 square miles) to the east. The municipality has an area of 45.247 km^{2}. On the main isle Fournoi (town) is the largest settlement and then Chrysomilia in the north the second largest (and third largest overall, after Thymaina). Fournoi (town) proper is the main ferry harbour, with ferries also landing on Thymaina.

Many of the inhabitants are fishermen, although during the summer season the population is also occupied in tourist activities, mostly room rentals and catering. On the main island are a number of beaches such as Vlychada, Vitsilia, Petrokopio, Elidaki, and Bali.

The archipelago is famous for being a hub of the Ancient World, which resulted in 53 shipwrecks found in the area until 2017. Another five shipwrecks were found in 2018, raising the total number to 58. Those wrecks date back from 4th century BC to 19th century AD.

== Climate ==
Fournoi has a hot-summer Mediterranean climate with hot, dry summers and wetter winters. Constant strong archipelagic winds prevail.

== Transportation ==
Transportation is often interrupted during the winter period (mostly from November to April) due to bad weather, mainly strong winds. The rest of the year regular links with the islands of Ikaria and Samos (by boat only) is available. Since 2008 a ferry coming from Samos reaches Athens stopping also in Icaria and Paros.

== Archaeology ==
A shallow-water ship graveyard containing nearly 60 ships lies off Fournoi. Although the site had been plundered and damaged, amphorae as well as a shipment of 2nd-century CE Corinthian terracotta lamps were recovered from some of the ships.

== Settlements and islands ==
The main island of Fournoi has a population of 1,149 (as of the 2021 census), 86 percent of the municipality's population. The only other inhabited islands are Agios Minas and Thymaina.

Settlement or Place	Population	Island
Agios Ioannis Thermastis	12	Fournoi Island
Agios Minas	3	Agios Minas Island
Alatonisi	0	Alatonisi Island
Anthropofas	0	Anthropofas Island
Bali	28	Fournoi Island
Chrysomilea	86	Fournoi Island
Dafnolies	3	Fournoi Island
Fournoi	898	Fournoi Island
Kamari	27	Fournoi Island
Kampi Fournon	39	Fournoi Island
Kampi Chrysomileas	44	Fournoi Island
Kerameidou	12	Thymaina Island
Plagia	12	Fournoi Island
Kisiria	0	Kisiria Island
Makronisi	0	Makronisi Island
Mikros Anthropofas	0	Mikros Anthropofas Island
Petrokaravo	0	Petrokaravo Island
Plaka	0	Plaka Island
Plakaki	0	Plakaki Island
Strongylo	0	Strongylo Island
Thymaina	179	Thymaina Island
Thymainaki	0	Thymainaki Island
