= Evdilos =

Village in Ikaria, Greece

Evdilos Εύδηλος
- Municipal unit
- Location within the regional unit

- Location within Greece
- Coordinates: 37°38′N 26°11′E
- Country: Greece
- Administrative region: North Aegean
- Regional unit: Ikaria
- Municipality: Ikaria

Area
  - Municipal unit: 78.8 km^{2} (30.4 sq mi)

Population (2021)
  - Municipal unit: 2,996
  - Municipal unit density: 38.0/km^{2} (98.5/sq mi)
  - Community: 847
- Time zone: UTC+2 (EET)
  - Summer (DST): UTC+3 (EEST)
- Postal code: 83302
- Area code: 22750
- Vehicle registration: ΜΟ

Evdilos (Greek: Εύδηλος) is a village and a former municipality in the central part of the island of Ikaria, North Aegean, Greece. Since the 2011 local government reform it is part of the municipality Ikaria, of which it is a municipal unit. 40 km northwest of Agios Kirykos. Its name means visible and freely rendered open horizon.

It is a new seaside settlement built after 1830 when piracy was completely stamped out on the island. Evdilos was the first capital of the island. Today it is the second port and the center of northern, central, and western Ikaria. Together with other settlements, it forms the municipal unit of Evdilos and had 2,996 permanent inhabitants at the 2021 census. The municipal unit has a land area of 78.790 km², and is the second-largest of the three on Icaria both in population and land area. It shares the island of Icaria with the municipal units of Agios Kirykos and Raches.

The picturesque small port and the pier with the old mansions and narrow roads, the paved steps, and the traditional and modern houses form an architecturally unique village. A beach is located on the outskirts of the village.

== Frantato ==
The community of Frantato (Τοπική Κοινότητα Φραντάτου) with 728 inhabitants (2021) and 17.48 km² area lies west of Evdilos and borders neighboring Raches.

- Frantato (Φραντάτο)
- Maratho (Μάραθο)
- Pigi (Πηγή); in the vicinity of the village lies the Theoktistis Monastery (Μονή Θεοκτίστης). It was founded in the Byzantine era. The first church was built around 1300 C.E.. At its peak, around the 15th century, the monastery was inhabited by around 100 monks, but since 1982 it is deserted.
- Stavlos (Στάβλος)
- Avlaki (Αυλάκι)
- Kampos (Κάμπος); within its boundaries lies the antique city of Oinoë (Οινόη), which was the capital of the island until the Byzantine time. Of the Byzantine town only the Odeion, city walls and several buildings are still visible. Wine production constituted the basic income of the city, of which a sum had to be paid to the Attic Treasure. The archaeological museum of Kampos lies next to the Agia Irini church, which was built on the ruins of the classic temple of Dionysos.
- Kalamourida (Καλαμουρίδα)
- Kremasti (Κρεμαστή)
