= Ikaria (regional unit) =

Ikaria Περιφερειακή ενότητα Ικαρίας
- Regional unit
- Ikaria within Greece

- Location within Greece
- Coordinates: 37°40′N 26°20′E
- Country: Greece
- Administrative region: North Aegean

Area
  - Total: 300.6 km^{2} (116.1 sq mi)

Population (2021)
  - Total: 10,186
  - Density: 33.89/km^{2} (87.76/sq mi)
- Time zone: UTC+2 (EET)
  - Summer (DST): UTC+3 (EEST)

Ikaria (Greek: Περιφερειακή ενότητα Ικαρίας) is one of the regional units of Greece. It is part of the region of North Aegean. The regional unit covers the island of Ikaria and the small archipelago Fournoi Korseon, in the Aegean Sea.

== Administration ==
As a part of the 2011 Kallikratis government reform, the regional unit Ikaria was created out of part of the former Samos Prefecture. It is subdivided into 2 municipalities. These are (number as in the map in the infobox):

Municipality	Municipal Units	Seat
Ikaria	Agios Kirykos	Agios Kirykos
Ikaria	Evdilos	Agios Kirykos
Ikaria	Raches	Agios Kirykos
Fournoi Korseon	Fournoi Korseon	Fournoi

=== Province ===
The province of Ikaria (Greek: Επαρχία Ικαρίας) was one of the provinces of the Samos Prefecture. It had the same territory as the present regional unit. It was abolished in 2006.

== Politics ==
=== Precincts ===
The regional unit is idivided in 15 precincts, 12 in Ikaria and 3 in Fournoi. The precincts correspond to the local communities of Ikaria, with the only exception being Fournoi, which is divided in 3 precincts.

Precincts of Ikaria regional unit.

	Precinct	Electorate (2024)
1	Agios Kirykos	3,317
2	Agios Polykarpos	874
3	Arethousa	233
4	Chrysostomos	486
5	Dafni	730
6	Evdilos	879
7a	Fournoi	1,239
7b	Chrysomilia	153
7c	Thymaina	187
8	Frantato	694
9	Karavostamo	763
10	Karkinagri	430
11	Maganitis	306
12	Perdiki	709
13	Raches	1,470

=== Election results ===
==== Parliamentary ====
2009

5/2023

6/2023

==== European ====
2024
