= Regional units of Greece =

Third-level administrative entities of Greece

Regional units of Greece Περιφερειακές ενότητες της Ελλάδας (Greek)
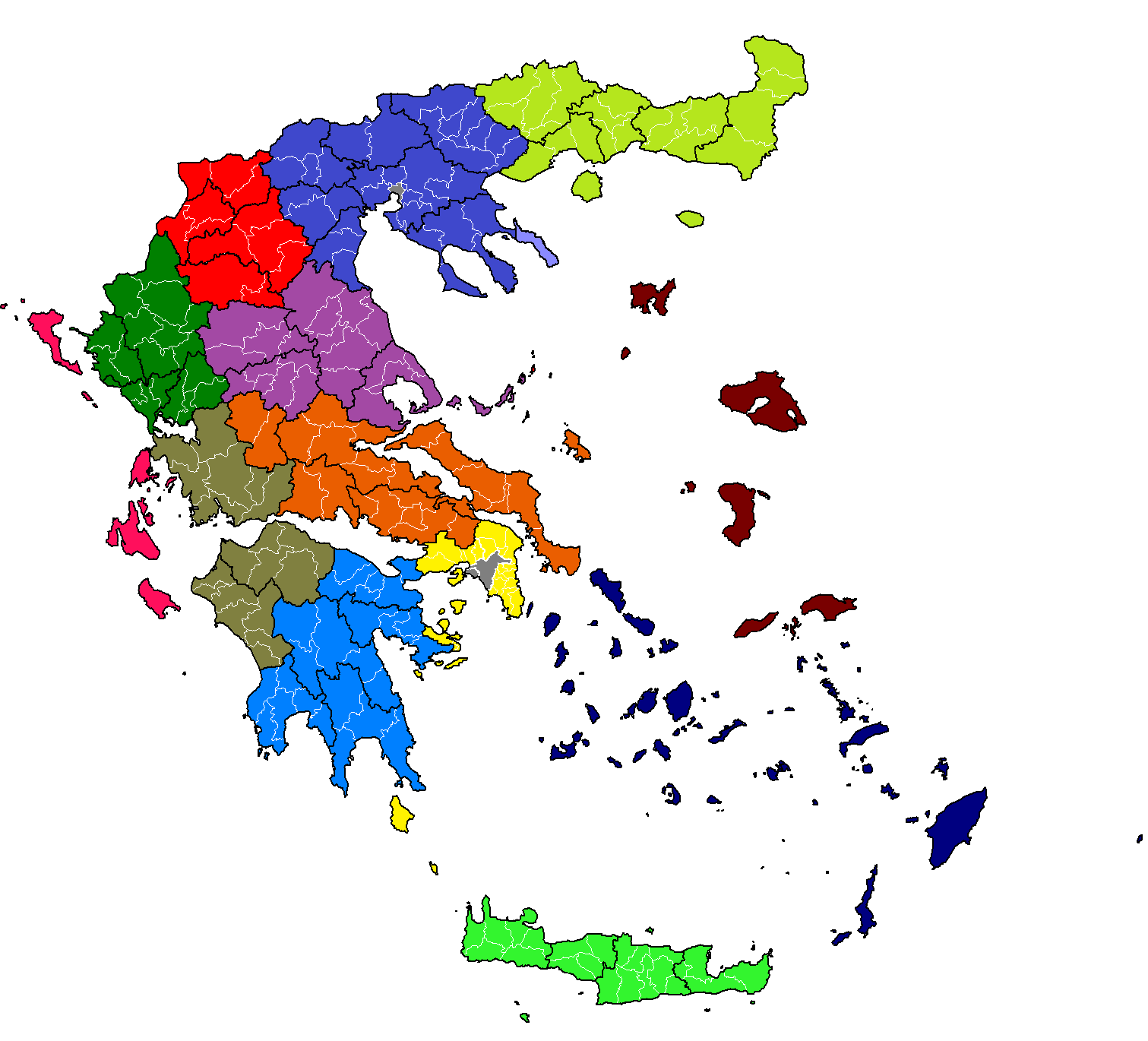
- Category: Unitary state
- Location: Hellenic Republic
- Number: 74 regional units
- Areas: 2,307 km^{2} (891 sq mi) (Ionian Islands) – 18,810 km^{2} (7,260 sq mi) (Central Macedonia)
- Government: Central government Regional governments monastic government (Athos)
- Subdivisions: Municipalities

The 74 regional units of Greece (Note: Greek: περιφερειακές ενότητες, romanized: perifereiakés henótites, pronounced [peɾifeɾiaˈces̠ eˈnotites̠]) are the country's third-level administrative units (counting decentralized administrations as first-level). They are subdivisions of the country's 13 regions, and are further divided into municipalities.

They were introduced as part of the Kallikratis administrative reform on 1 January 2011 and are comparable in area and, on the mainland, coterminous with the "pre-Kallikratis" prefectures of Greece.

== List ==
Administrative region	Regional unit	Prefecture it was created from
Attica	North Athens	Athens (part)
Attica	West Athens	Athens (part)
Attica	Central Athens	Athens (part)
Attica	South Athens	Athens (part)
Attica	East Attica	East Attica
Attica	Piraeus	Piraeus (part)
Attica	Islands	Piraeus (part)
Attica	West Attica	West Attica
Central Greece	Boeotia	Boeotia
Central Greece	Euboea	Euboea
Central Greece	Evrytania	Evrytania
Central Greece	Phocis	Phocis
Central Greece	Phthiotis	Phthiotis
Central Macedonia	Imathia	Imathia
Central Macedonia	Thessaloniki	Thessaloniki
Central Macedonia	Kilkis	Kilkis
Central Macedonia	Pella	Pella
Central Macedonia	Pieria	Pieria
Central Macedonia	Serres	Serres
Central Macedonia	Chalkidiki	Chalkidiki
Crete	Chania	Chania
Crete	Heraklion	Heraklion
Crete	Lasithi	Lasithi
Crete	Rethymno	Rethymno
East Macedonia and Thrace	Drama	Drama
East Macedonia and Thrace	Evros	Evros
East Macedonia and Thrace	Thasos	Kavala (part)
East Macedonia and Thrace	Kavala	Kavala (part)
East Macedonia and Thrace	Xanthi	Xanthi
East Macedonia and Thrace	Rhodope	Rhodope
Epirus	Arta	Arta
Epirus	Ioannina	Ioannina
Epirus	Preveza	Preveza
Epirus	Thesprotia	Thesprotia
Ionian Islands	Corfu	Corfu
Ionian Islands	Ithaca	Cephalonia (part)
Ionian Islands	Cephalonia	Cephalonia (part)
Ionian Islands	Lefkada	Lefkada
Ionian Islands	Zakynthos	Zakynthos
North Aegean	Chios	Chios
North Aegean	Ikaria	Samos (part)
North Aegean	Lemnos	Lesbos (part)
North Aegean	Lesbos	Lesbos (part)
North Aegean	Samos	Samos (part)
Peloponnese	Arcadia	Arcadia
Peloponnese	Argolis	Argolis
Peloponnese	Corinthia	Corinthia
Peloponnese	Laconia	Laconia
Peloponnese	Messenia	Messenia
South Aegean	Andros	Cyclades (part)
South Aegean	Kalymnos	Dodecanese (part)
South Aegean	Karpathos-Kasos	Dodecanese (part)
South Aegean	Kea-Kythnos	Cyclades (part)
South Aegean	Kos	Dodecanese (part)
South Aegean	Milos	Cyclades (part)
South Aegean	Mykonos	Cyclades (part)
South Aegean	Naxos	Cyclades (part)
South Aegean	Paros	Cyclades (part)
South Aegean	Rhodes	Dodecanese (part)
South Aegean	Syros	Cyclades (part)
South Aegean	Santorini	Cyclades (part)
South Aegean	Tinos	Cyclades (part)
Thessaly	Karditsa	Karditsa
Thessaly	Larissa	Larissa
Thessaly	Magnesia	Magnesia (part)
Thessaly	Sporades	Magnesia (part)
Thessaly	Trikala	Trikala
West Greece	Achaea	Achaea
West Greece	Aetolia-Acarnania	Aetolia-Acarnania
West Greece	Elis	Elis
West Macedonia	Florina	Florina
West Macedonia	Grevena	Grevena
West Macedonia	Kastoria	Kastoria
West Macedonia	Kozani	Kozani
Monastic community of Mount Athos
